= Sarmaya Arts Foundation =

- Established: 2015
- Location: Mumbai
- Type: Archive
- Collections: Numismatics, Cartography, Photography, engravings, rare books, modern art, Folk Art
- Website: sarmaya.in

Sarmaya Arts Foundation is a not-for-profit curated repository of art, artefacts and living traditions from the Indian subcontinent, run by the Sarmaya Trust and led by Paul Abraham and Pavitra Rajaram. Founded by former IndusInd Bank COO Paul Abraham in 2015, Sarmaya started as a digital museum showcasing Abraham's private collection of numismatics, cartography, photography, engravings, modern art, living traditions and rare books. In 2024, the archive moved to a restored space inside the 146-year-old Lawrence & Mayo building on Dr DN Road in Fort, Mumbai. It houses the Sarmaya collection and a library of 15,000 books, and hosts events including the lecture series Sarmaya Talks. Past speakers have included, Devdutt Pattanaik, Javed Akhtar, Nayanjot Lahiri, Mallika Sarabhai, Manu S Pillai and Rudrangshu Mukherjee.

== Collections ==
The Sarmaya collection ranges from coins of the Gandhara age to Emperor Akbar’s gold mohur, a detailed map of the ancient dynasties that ruled India in 1022 AD, a selection of 19th century photographs presenting the first-ever portraits of India and triptych engraving of Tipu Sultan fighting the British army.

The genres in the collection are a mix of tribal and folk, including works by widely regarded genius of Gond art Jangarh Singh Shyam, as well as names like Phad painter Shrilal Joshi and Warli artist Jivya Soma Mhase. It also includes the works of Indian Modern masters like MF Husain, FN Souza and KH Ara, and an extensive body of works by Badri Narayan, AX Trindade and Jamini Roy.

A special project undertaken by Sarmaya founder Abraham has been the commission of Issa-nama: a miniature painting project depicting the life of Jesus Christ. The project has been undertaken in collaboration with miniature-painting artist Manish Soni in the Mughal painting and Hamzanama style.

== Special exhibitions ==
Sarmaya's debut exhibition opened in January 2018 with Portrait of a Nation, a collection of rare 19th century photography from the Indian subcontinent. The show was curated by photographer Madhavan Pillai and designed by conservationist Abha Narain Lamba highlighted connections between the evolution of photography and the political landscape in India. Photographers featured included Raja Deen Dayal, Samuel Bourne, Felice Beato and Thomas Biggs.

In August 2021, Sarmaya partnered with TARQ art gallery to stage the show Shifting Selves - Between meaning, mythology & mirage in Colaba, Mumbai. It centred around the themes of identity and self contained in the works of artists Saju Kunhan, Saubiya Chasmawala and Rithika Merchant. Their art was accompanied by other objects from Sarmaya's collection of 19th-century photography, numismatics and indigenous and contemporary Indian art. The exhibition also included a digital art installation by Gaurav Ogale and Farah Mulla.

In November 2022, Sarmaya partnered with Ojas Art in Delhi to stage the show Echoes of the Land - Art bears witness to a changing planet in Mehrauli. The exhibition featured contemporary Indian artists, most of whom practice traditional arts related to Mithila, Gond, Warli, Bhil and other indigenous communities. The paintings, all part of the Sarmaya collection, included works by Ram Singh Urveti, Krishnanand Jha, Mayur and Tushar Vayeda, Zarina Hashmi, Gopa Trivedi and Sanjay Chitara. The exhibition explored themes like climate-change, pollution, species extinction and other issues of the Anthropocene, through Indian art.

In January 2025, Sarmaya launched the exhibition 'High Seas, Open Roads' at its Mumbai archive. The travel-themed show featured, among other objects, the zodiac coins of Mughal emperor Jahangir, the travelogues of Robert Melville Grindlay and Fanny Parkes, 19th-century photographs by Samuel Bourne, and art by Rithika Merchant, Mayur and Tushar Vayeda, Saju Kunhan and Sindhe Chithambara Rao.

In March 2025, the nature-themed show 'In The Dappled Light' opened at Sarmaya. Among the exhibits were folios of illustrations from the Hortus Malabaricus, Century of Birds by John Gould, 'Illustrations of Himalayan Plants' by JD Hooker Plantae Asiaticae Rariores by Nathaniel Wallich, and 'Indian Botany' by Robert Wight. Also showcased were indigenous Indian art from the Gond, Mithila, Kalamkari, Warli, Bengal Pattachitra and miniature painting traditions by artists including, Japani Shyam, Mayank Shyam, Dulari Devi, Jonnalagadda Niranjan, Amit Dombhare, Tagar Chitrakar and Gopa Trivedi.

== Films ==
Sarmaya has produced two short films on living art traditions in India. Tholu Bommalaata – Dance of the Shadow Puppets documented the work of National Award-winning artist Sindhe Chithambara Rao and his family in Dharmavaram, Andhra Pradesh. The documentary won 3rd place at the Chitra Bharati Film Festival, 2022. Another film Madhubani - Art from a Sacred Land focused on the family of Moti Karn and Jyoti Karn, representing two generations of traditional Madhubani artists from Jitwarpur, Bihar.
