= Jangarh Singh Shyam =

Indian painter (1962–2001)

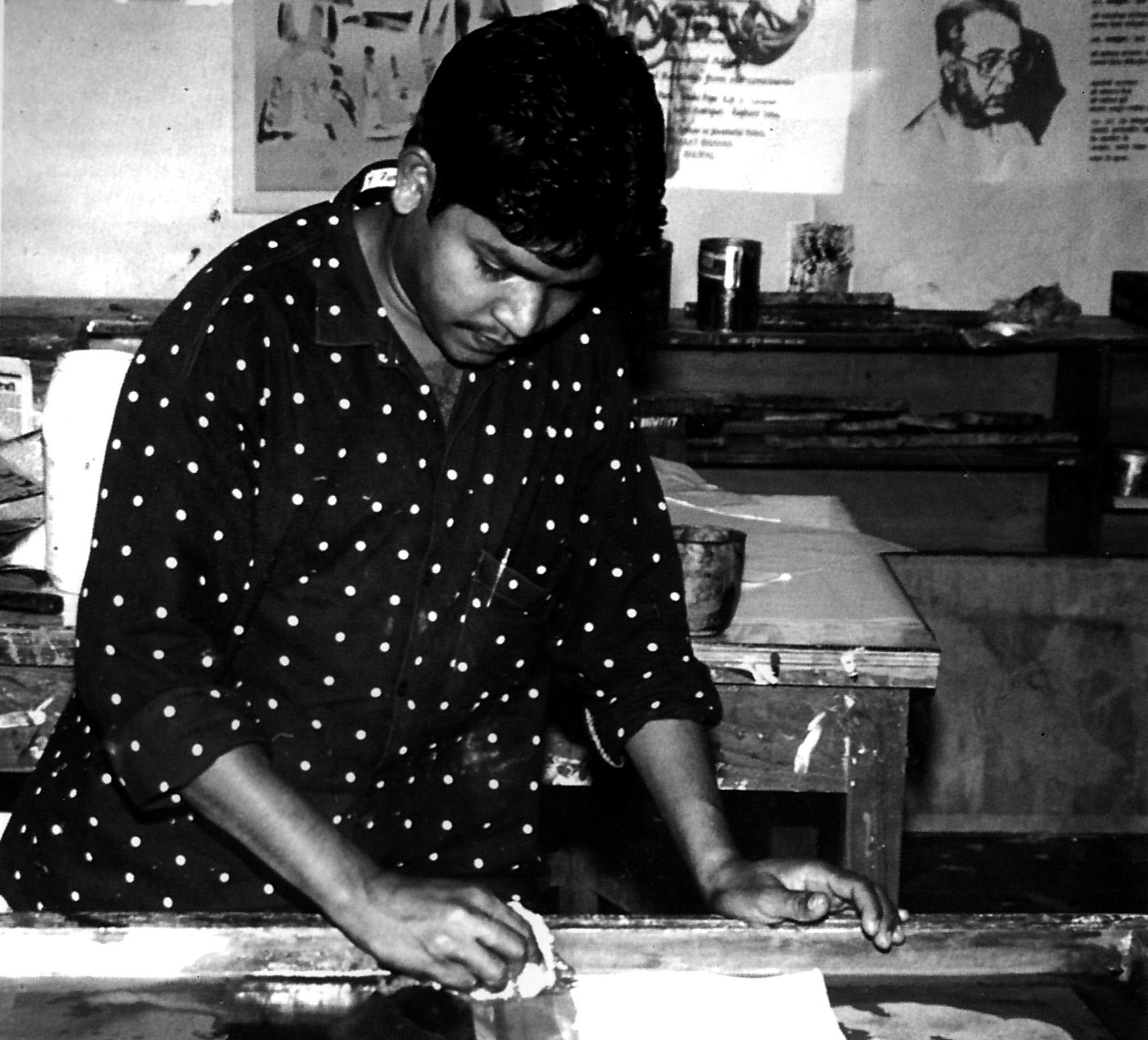
- Jangarh Singh Shyam at work at Bharat Bhavan
- Born: 1962; Patangarh, Madhya Pradesh, India
- Died: 2001 (aged 38–39); Tokamachi, Japan
- Known for: Painting, drawing, sculpture, mural
- Movement: Jangarh Kalam
- Spouse: Nankusia Bai
- Awards: Shikhar Samman

Jangarh Singh Shyam (1962–2001) was a pioneering contemporary Indian artist credited with being the creator of a new school of Indian art called Jangarh Kalam. His work has been exhibited widely the world over including Bhopal, Delhi, Tokyo and New York. His most notable exhibitions include the Magiciens de la terre in Paris (1989) and Other Masters curated by Jyotindra Jain at the Crafts Museum, New Delhi (1998). His 1988 piece Landscape with Spider sold for $31,250 at Sotheby's, New York, in 2010—a first for an adivasi artist. Jangarh had also painted the interiors of the Legislative Assembly of Madhya Pradesh, the Vidhan Bhavan, and the dome of Bhopal's Bharat Bhavan—one of the most prestigious museums of tribal and contemporary Indian art. He was among the first Gond artists to use paper and canvas for his paintings, thereby inaugurating what is now known as Jangarh Kalam.

== Biography ==
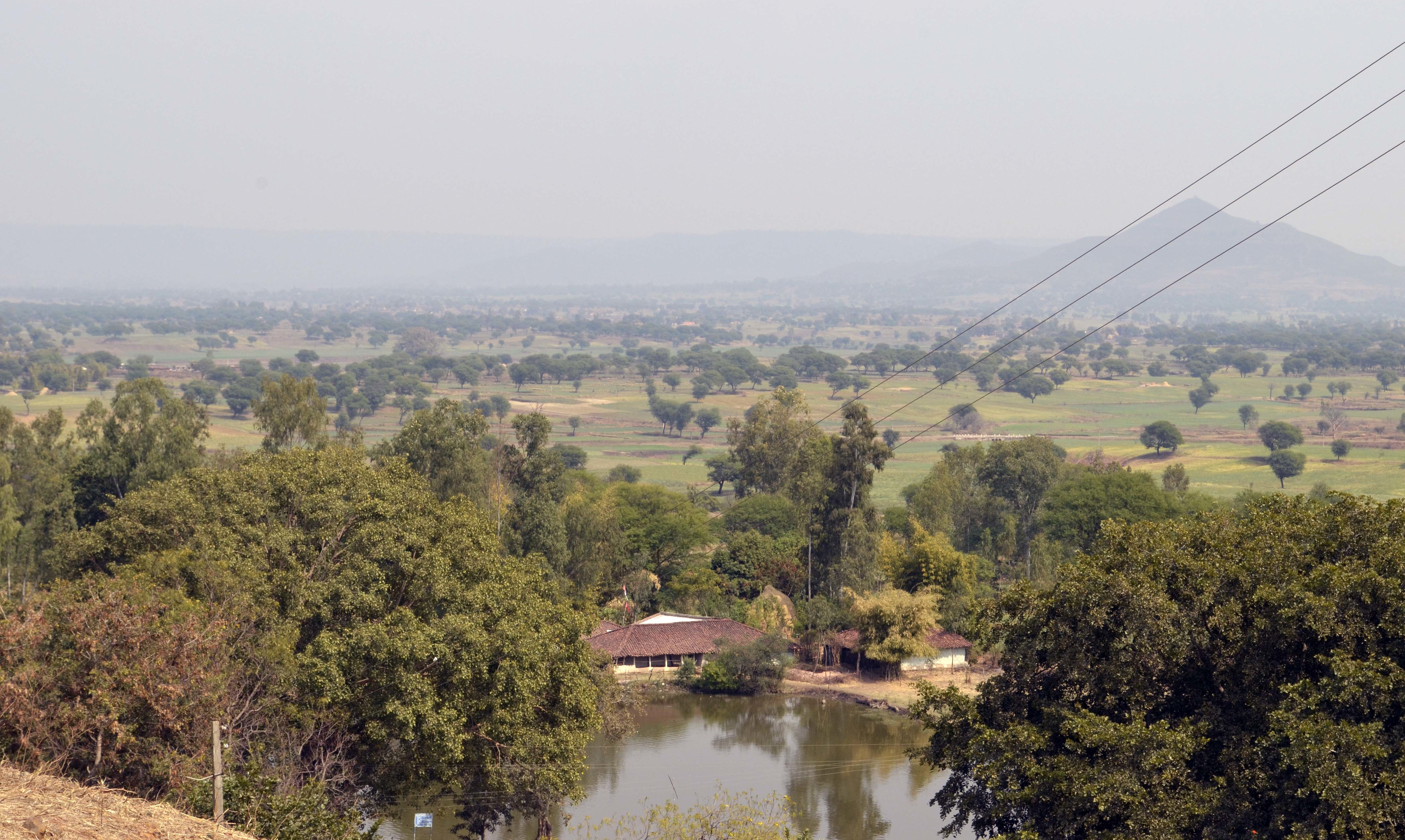
Patangarh village, Mandla district, Madhya Pradesh

Jangarh was born into a Pardhan Gond family in the village of Patangarh, Mandla district, (Dindori District), Eastern Madhya Pradesh. He grew up in extreme poverty which forced him to quit school and try his hand at farming. He grazed buffaloes and sold milk in a nearby town.

At the age of sixteen he married Nankusia Bai from Sonpur village; she was to later become a fellow artist. In October 1981, a few years into his marriage, Jangarh was approached by the talent scouts of the arts museum Bharat Bhavan. This was also when he met its first director, the artist Jagdish Swaminathan which led to a lifelong collaboration between the two. Swaminathan convinced Jangarh to come and work as a professional artist in Bhopal.

Swaminathan showcased Jangarh's first sample paintings at Bharat Bhavan's inaugural exhibition in February 1982. Soon Jangarh was employed in Bharat Bhavan's graphic arts department, and he began to live with his family behind Swaminathan's house in Professor's Colony, Bhopal.

He achieved fame quickly when, in 1986, merely five years after his 'discovery', the twenty-six-year old was conferred the Shikhar Samman (the Summit Award)— the highest civilian award bestowed by the Government of Madhya Pradesh. He was subsequently commissioned to do the exterior murals for Vidhan Bhavan—the new legislative building in Bhopal designed by the renowned architect Charles Correa. In 1989, his art was displayed in the Pompidou Centre's Magiciens de la Terre (Magicians of Earth) exhibition in Paris. He went on to do residential stints at the Mithila Museum in Tokamachi, Japan.

=== Death ===
In 2001, it was during his second residency at the Mithila Museum that Jangarh hanged himself. The reasons for his taking his life are not clearly known, though the Indian artistic community was quick to blame the owner of the museum in Japan. The art historian and critic, Yashodhara Dalmia, said this was as "a grim reminder of the growing trafficking of unsung artists worldwide" in an obituary in Outlook magazine.

Shyam was not the only Indian artist from the margins to work in Niigata. Renowned Madhubani artists of Mithila such as Ganga Devi and Shanti Devi as well as Warli artists such as Jivya Soma Mashe have worked there and continue to do so. Upon his death, artists and writers such as M.F. Husain, Manjit Bawa and Nirmal Verma urged the governments of India and Japan to inquire into the mysterious circumstances of his suicide. Many artists, writers and art collectors appealed to the authorities at a meeting at the Crafts Museum, Delhi to protect tribal artists from being exploited by foreign agencies.

The Mithila Museum came under a lot of criticism from Jangarh's friends and family as well. Initially, the founder-director Tokio Hasegawa declared that he had not 'budgeted' for Jangarh's remains to be sent to his family in Bhopal and the museum proposed cremation in Japan. Eventually, the body was transported and Jangarh's last rites were performed in Bhopal.

In 2002, a year later, the Mithila Museum offered their own version of Jangarh's death on their website, authored by the curator Miyoko Hasunama. The museum pleaded ignorance of Jangarh's ongoing depression and treatment which his friend, Akhilesh Verma, has since spoken about.

Jangarh is survived by his wife Nankusia Bai and two children Mayank Shyam and Japani Shyam—all acclaimed practitioners of Jangarh Kalam.

== Style ==
Jangarh is credited by the critic Udayan Vajpeyi to be the initiator of a new school of Indian art which he calls 'Jangarh Kalam'. The primary subjects of Jangarh's paintings are Gond deities like Thakur Dev, Bada Deo, Kalsahin Devi and others. He also depicts cutout-style portraits of animals. Tigers, deer, turtles and crocodiles crowd his canvases.

The Pardhan Gond community is traditionally one of musicians who used to receive patronage from the Gond Rajas. With the impoverishment and weakening of the social order of adivasi communities first by colonial apparatuses and then the administration of independent India, patronage to the Pardhans eroded. With the practical significance of their story-singing gone, they turned to agriculture and labour to sustain themselves.

According to Vajpeyi, Jangarh's art arose from this creative background and created a new means of expression for members of his community. Vajpeyi says of Jangarh's art:

Jangarh Kalam is an adaptation of the Pardhan music. The transformation of music into visual form. The peculiarity of Pardhan music is that it has the disturbed equilibrium of music notes. That music like most Adivasi music, assumes form in disturbed equilibrium. It has neither the harmony of Western classical music nor the melody of Khayal (Natya).

Jangarh used lines of coloured dots to create shapes and patterns in his paintings. The dots were inspired by the tattoos that form a part of Gond life. Jangarh also used other techniques like "fields of dense cross-hatching, tightly drawn comb-lines, rows of tiny ovals, bands of dots, sometimes accompanied by narrow squiggles and small irregular amoeba-like forms". His paintings have employed peripheral contours of radiating lines to suggest power or movement. His famous painting Owl (1997, acrylic on canvas) employs this technique.

The curator and art collector Hervé Pedriolle describes the evolution of Jangarh's oeuvre on his blog: "His early works show a rare primitive force, his last works show a fabulous graphic mastery. A feeling of intense vibration is the hallmark of his style, the cohesion of his work in constant metamorphosis, which reveals both the animist culture of the Gond tribe, where he is originally from, and one of the foundations of Indian thought".

Jangarh Singh Shyam's art has nearly always been categorized as tribal art, a label that some art critics have accused to be a colonial slant. In an essay on an exhibition of Jangarh's art, the cultural theorist Ranjit Hoskote says:

The designation "tribal" froze vibrant communities into stigmatizing categories, branding them as hereditary criminals, incorrigible nomads or ignoble savages, while the colonial-industrial regime helped itself to their forests, rivers and mountains. From this repressive viewpoint, we arrive at the belief that the tribals are backward people whose energies are caught up with the mythic rhythms of nature. We thus rob them of all agency as legitimate contributors to the project of modernity.

He insists on 'Jangarh Kalam' or the 'Style of Jangarh' as a more accurate name since such 'Gond art' did not exist before him.

== Exhibitions ==
=== Solo ===
- Art Heritage 10, New Delhi, 1990
- Chemould Art Gallery, Bombay, 1992
- In association with Madhya Pradesh Kala Parishad at Raipur, 1995
- Sahajhan Art Gallery, New Delhi, 1997
- Chemould Art Gallery, Bombay, 2009

=== Group ===
- Group Art Exhibition, Ahmedabad, 1984
- Faculty of Fine Arts, M.S. University Baroda, 1985
- Triennal of Invitee Artists, New Delhi, 1986
- Biennal of Indian Contemporary Art, Bharat Bhavan, Bhopal,1989
- Indian Contemporary Art, Bharat Bhavan, Bhopal, 1983, 83, 84, 85, 86, 88 and 1991
- Bharat Bhavan International Print Biennal, Bhopal, 1989
- National Gallery of Modern Art, New Delhi, 1990
- L.T.G. Gallery, New Delhi, 1990
- South Central Zone Cultural Centre, Nagpur 1990
- Jehangir Art Gallery, Bombay 1990
- All India Art Exhibition, Jaipur 1992
- Lalit Kala Academy, New Delhi 1995
- Other Masters, Craft Museum, New Delhi 1998

=== Exhibitions Abroad ===
- Bharat Mahotsav, London 1988.
- Bharat Mahotsav, Japan 1988
- Magiciens de la Terre, Centre Pompidou, Paris 1989
- Nine Contemporary Indian Artists, the Netherlands 1992
- Indian Songs, Multiple Streams of Contemporary Indian Art, New South Wales, Australia 1993
- Expéditions Indiennes, Musée des Arts Décoratifs, Paris 1998
- Hervé Perdriolle Galerie, Paris 2010
- Painted Song & Stories, Davis Museum, USA 2010
- Autres maîtres de l'Inde, Musée du Quai Branly, Paris 2010
- Show and Tell, Fondation Cartier, Paris 2012
- Gwangju Biennale, Korea 2012

== Legacy ==
Other than propelling the now varied and vibrant school of 'Jangarh kalam', Jangarh is also duly credited for being the harbinger of new perspectives, talent and stylistic innovations within that school. He introduced his extended family to his studio and artistic practices in Bhopal. His house in Professors Colony became a hub for several Pardhan Gond artists who migrated to the city hoping Jangarh would show them the way. Some of them further extended the style to sculpture as well, notable among whom are Gangaram, Ram Kumar Shyam and Sukhnandi Vyam. When Sukhnandi exhibited his work at the Wieden+Kennedy gallery in Delhi in 2010, Caravan magazine said that his "work challenges many cultural binaries we tend to accept unquestioningly: metropolitan and rural, traditional and (Post) Modern, art and craft". Some other Gond artists who have carved a niche for themselves are Ram Singh Urveti, Bhajju Shyam (author of the much acclaimed London Jungle Book), Rajendra Shyam, Suresh Dhurve and Narmada Prasad Tekam.

After Jangarh's death, Nankusia Bai continued to work at Bharat Bhavan, Bhopal. Her independent creations have been exhibited in Dubai, Japan and Sri Lanka. In 2002, she was presented a state level award by the Madhya Pradesh Hasta Shilpa Vikas Nigam.

Jangarh brought his brother-in-law Subhash Vyam and his wife Durgabai Vyam to his house in Bhopal. Today, Durgabai has emerged to be one of the most well-known Pardhan Gond artists with many books to her credit, most of them published by Tara Books, Chennai. In 2011, Subhash and Durgabai co-authored Bhimayana, the graphic biography of B.R. Ambedkar with Srividya Natarajan and S. Anand published by Navayana, New Delhi.

Jangarh's nephew Venkat Raman Singh Shyam has also developed his distinct style and gone on to achieve international fame after working as Jangarh's apprentice in Bhopal during his early years. He is currently working on a graphic autobiography titled Finding My Way in collaboration with S. Anand.

Jangarh's daughter Japani Shyam was given the Kamala Devi Award in 1999, at the age of eleven. She works on motifs of animals and birds and visual examinations of Gond rituals.

His son Mayank Shyam, also an artist, has moved away considerably from the first-generation iconography and style of Gond art and focuses on geometrical patterns. He participated in his first group exhibition called Primal Force (2006) at Kolkata's CIMA Gallery at the age of 19. His works were also included in the Indian Contemporary Art Auction at Sotheby’s, New York, organized for the benefit of Kolkata Museum of Modern Art. In 2006, Mayank was conferred the state award by the Hasta Shilpa Evam Hathkargha Vikas Nigam in Bhopal.

Jangarh Film Ek, a 2008 Indian documentary short film by Amit Datta explores the work and life of the artist.

== See also ==
- Warli
