= Nankusia Shyam =

Gond artists

- Born: Sonpuri, Madhya Pradesh, India
- Spouse: Jangarh Singh Shyam
- Children: Mayank Shyam (Son) and Japani Shyam (daughter)
- Awards: Madhya Pradesh Hasta Shilpa Vikas Nigam; 2002 State level Award – visual artist

Nankusia Shyam is a Gond artists who carry forward Janagarh Kalam — the new school of Gond art created by her husband Jangarh Singh Shyam (1962–2001).

== Early life ==
Shyam is brought up in the village Sonpuri of Madhya Pradesh. Later she was married to Gond artist Jangarh Singh Shyam.

== Career ==
Shyam started her painting under the guidance of her husband Jangarh Shyam who encouraged her to carry the legacy of Gond art with her own expression. In 2001 when her husband committed suicide she took up this art more seriously. Later she works in Kala Bhavan an art museum in Bhopal as an assistant artist. After her husband's death she is working in Bharat Bhavan, Bhopal where her husband used to work.

== Style and themes ==
Shyam paints animals remembering her childhood period. She draws her memory of urban culture through the shape of those animals. Her painting usually based on bright vibrant colour and prominent impression of Gond art.

== Exhibition ==
Shyam had her exhibition in the cities of Delhi, Jaypur and Bhopal and with other exhibitions in the state of Kerala. She had her International exhibition in Japan, France, Sri Lanka and in the UAE.

== Books ==
Bulli and the Tiger- a book for children where Shyam had illustrated birds, animals and trees through dots.

== Awards ==
Shyam had received a state-level award from Madhya Pradesh Hasta Shilpa Vikas Nigam in 2002.
