= The New Peace Process =

The New Peace Process is an initiative of a conglomerate of tribal and non-government support groups and individuals, with the aim of bringing a negotiated settlement to the 50-year-old Maoist insurgency in Central India. Bastar Dialogues are a series of activities that started in mid 2018 by the New Peace Process to initiate a dialogue between the Naxalites and state security forces to restore peace in Central India.

== History ==
=== 2018 ===
==== Bastar Dialogue 1: Vikalp Sangam ====
The New Peace Process commenced with the first Bastar Dialogue, a three-day consultation event held at Tilda Chhattisgarh on 8 June 2018. Just before the December election of 2018, combined efforts by some Left-leaning intellectuals, peace activists, non-governmental organisations and civil society and tribal leaders of Bastar were aimed at opening channels of communication between representatives of the state government and the Maoist rebels. With the central theme of the event being "Finding an alternative path", the tribal communities caught in the crossfire were the focus of the meeting at Tilda and tribal groups from northeastern states, Andhra Pradesh-Telangana, Jharkhand, Maharashtra came down to Chhattisgarh. Self-rule/autonomy in tribal areas was discussed with emphasis on the sixth Schedule of the constitution. The Bodoland autonomous council, healthcare and educational facilities in Naxal areas and need for tribal leadership to emerge were scrutinised heavily. Among many, the key speakers included the Chairman of the National Commission of Scheduled Tribes (NCST), Nand Kumar Sai; the pioneer of peace negotiations, Prof. Haragopal; former Central Cabinet Minister, Arvind Netam; former Chhattisgarh Finance Minister, Ramchandra Singhdeo; former Madhya Pradesh Chief Secretary, Sharad Chandra Behar; Deshbandhu Chief Editor, Lalit Surjan; Prof. Madhulika Banerjee; and BPS Netam of Sarv Adivasi Samaj. Various activists and journalists also addressed the gathering and expressed their concern for violence in Central India and advocated community-based growth and peaceful living of Adivasis, Dalits and other communities. A 200km yatra from Andhra Pradesh to Jagdalpur was proposed, symbolic of the route taken by Maoists in 1980. This non-partisan walk would facilitate dialogue as opposed to confrontation. Another key discussion point was the relevance of existing mass media platforms and cultural initiatives that are happening in Central India and how they can be mobilised further to promote peace. Two prominent initiatives were Deepa Kiran's session on storytelling, which emphasised on the need to shift the storytelling paradigm from far removed English speaking western concepts to more experience-based stories, and CGNet’s work on the democratisation of media. As per the report on proceedings of Vikalp Sangam, the 3-day event ‘engaged in understanding the various non-violent alternatives created by people in the field, such as strengthening gram sabhas under PESA; getting access to rights, privileges and dues under the Forest Rights Act (FRA); undertaking a march advocating for peace; and creating alternative models in education, health, media, agriculture and cottage industry. The Sangam was an endeavour to envision an alternative future for the Adivasis, Dalits and the poor through strengthening egalitarianism in self-rule and eco-centric development practices.’ A poll taken on the 3rd and final day of the event revealed that there were 70 people from 11 states, and a majority of people (73%) were from rural India.

==== Bastar Dialogue 2: Shanti Padyatra ====
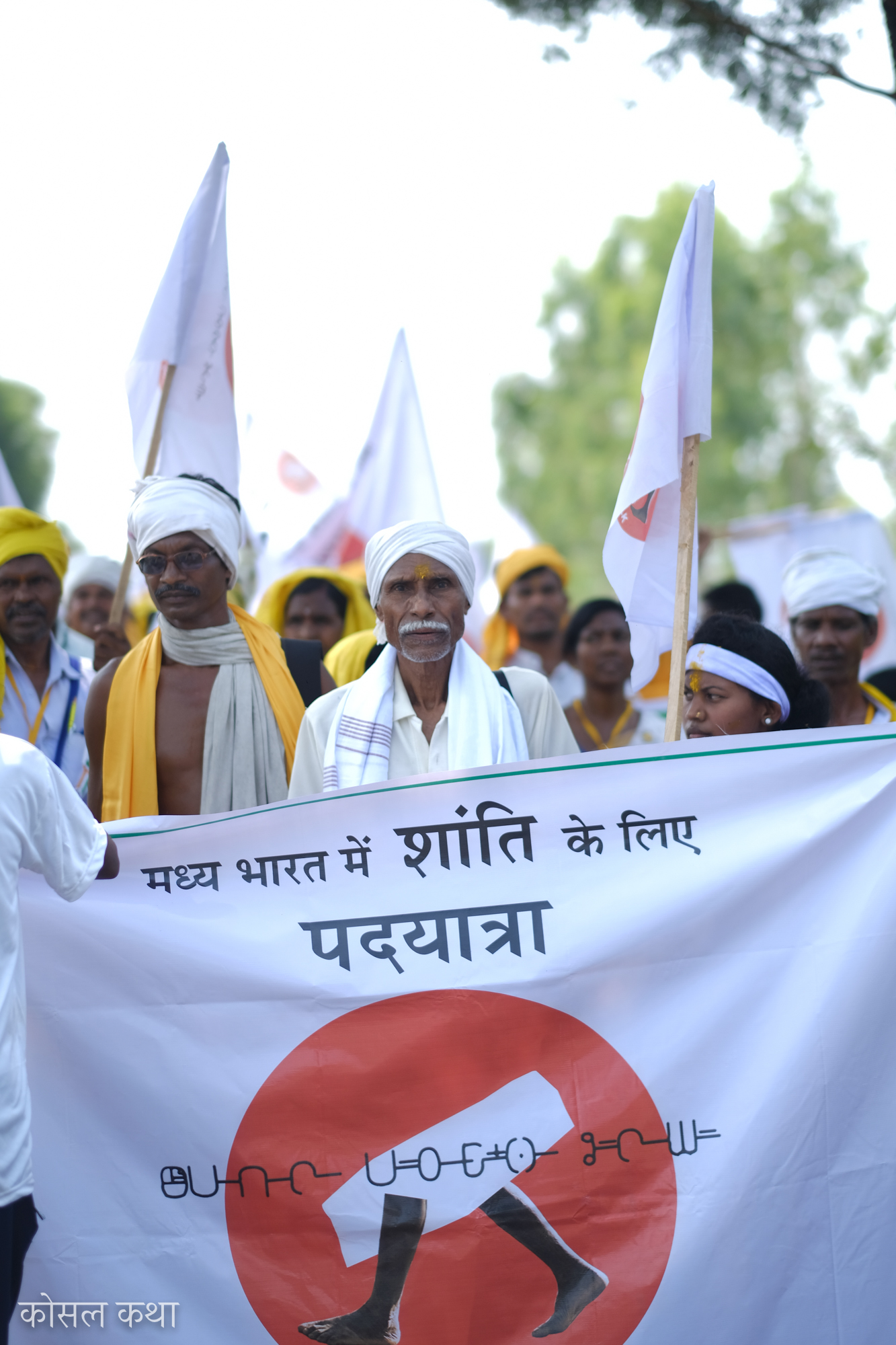
Participants undertaking the 190km Shanti Padyatra

After establishing that the Peace Process should be helmed by the Adivasi community, Adivasis from the Gond community of Telangana assumed the leadership role. One of the key decisions made at Bastar Dialogue 1 was undertaking an 11-day Shanti Padyatra (peace march) on 2 October 2018, marking Mahatma Gandhi’s 150th birth anniversary. Over 150 Adivasis participated in the 190 km padyatra from Chatti to Jagdalpur. The march was concluded with a two-day conclave- Bastar Dialogue 2, organized in Jagdalpur on 12 and 13 October 2018, to commemorate the end of the padyatra and discuss the way forward. 160 people attended the conclave, including academics, bureaucrats, individuals, community elders and leaders, scholars, human rights activists, journalists and the 130 padyatris from Chhattisgarh, Andhra Pradesh, Madhya Pradesh, Telangana and Maharashtra who had walked the entire stretch for 10 days. The participants walked the same route through which Naxalites had entered Dandakaranya from seven different openings in 1980, and appeal for peace from all sides. Shubhranshu Choudhary, one of the organisers stated,"As many as 12,000 people have died in the past 20 years due to exchange of fire between government forces and Maoists. Among 12000 people, 9300 were Adivasis, the original inhabitants of the land." The then spokesperson of Communist Party of India (Maoists) Dandakaranya Special Zonal Committee, had issued a statement wherein he appealed to boycott the new peace process and its aides such as Shubhranshu Choudhary, stating that the march was a move to stop Bastar tribals from fighting for their jal, jungle, zameen (water, forest, land). The participants commenced the march despite the boycott call. Along with initiating discussions for peaceful negotiations, Bastar Dialogue 2 also focused on Adivasi education, healthcare, and laws pertaining to their welfare. "This peace process is long drawn and would require time to achieve its ultimate aim of establishing peace and self-sustenance. Even if one life is saved through this peace process, it would be considered as a success", Shubhranshu added.

=== 2019 ===
==== Bastar Dialogue 3: Cycle Yatra ====
The third Bastar dialogue was conducted on 2 and 3 March in Banjari, Raipur. The two points of discussion for this event were- rehabilitation of 30,000 IDPs (internally displaced people), around 5000 families, who were forced out of their homelands during the Salwa Judum and could never find a way back home; and appealing to revisit the findings of the Nirmala Bench Committee, review and fast-track cases of adivasis that had been wrongly incarcerated. It was preceded by a Cycle Yatra, wherein 300 participants cycled for 300km from Jagdalpur to Raipur. The week-long bicycle procession started on 22 Feb. Chhattisgarh MLA and Tribal Minister Shri Kawasi Lakhma graced the event on the second day and lent an ear to the requests and problems put forth by the Adivasis and IDPs. The Cycle Yatra (and Bastar Dialogue 3) helped focus media attention on the problems faced by the victims of Maoist conflict and Salwa Judum. On 25 April 2019, 24 families that fled the Maraiguda village in Chhattisgarh’s Sukma district and settled in Andhra as agricultural labourers, more than a decade ago, returned to their roots.

==== Bastar Dialogue 4: Pen Pandum ====
Pen Pandum, which translates to ‘Festival of the Gods’ in the local Gondi language, began in Konta, Chhattisgarh on 12 and 13 June 2019. The session commenced with a long series of prayers by five native priests, led by Sher Singh Achala. In the presence of more than 300 tribals, he invoked the Gods of 644 abandoned villages, praying for support for those displaced by conflict, as they look for more settled lives. To commemorate the lost euphony of drums in the conflict ridden areas, the participants danced late into the night. As part of the dialogue, the first application forms for new homes were completed by 350 tribals displaced by violence who wished to be rehabilitated under 3.1(m) of the Forest Rights Act, under which Scheduled Tribes and other traditional forest dwellers are entitled to "in situ rehabilitation including alternative land in cases where they have been illegally evicted or displaced from their forest land." In the case of IDPs and adivasis, the land they earlier owned and fell into Maoist territory could be exchanged for safer land along the highways.

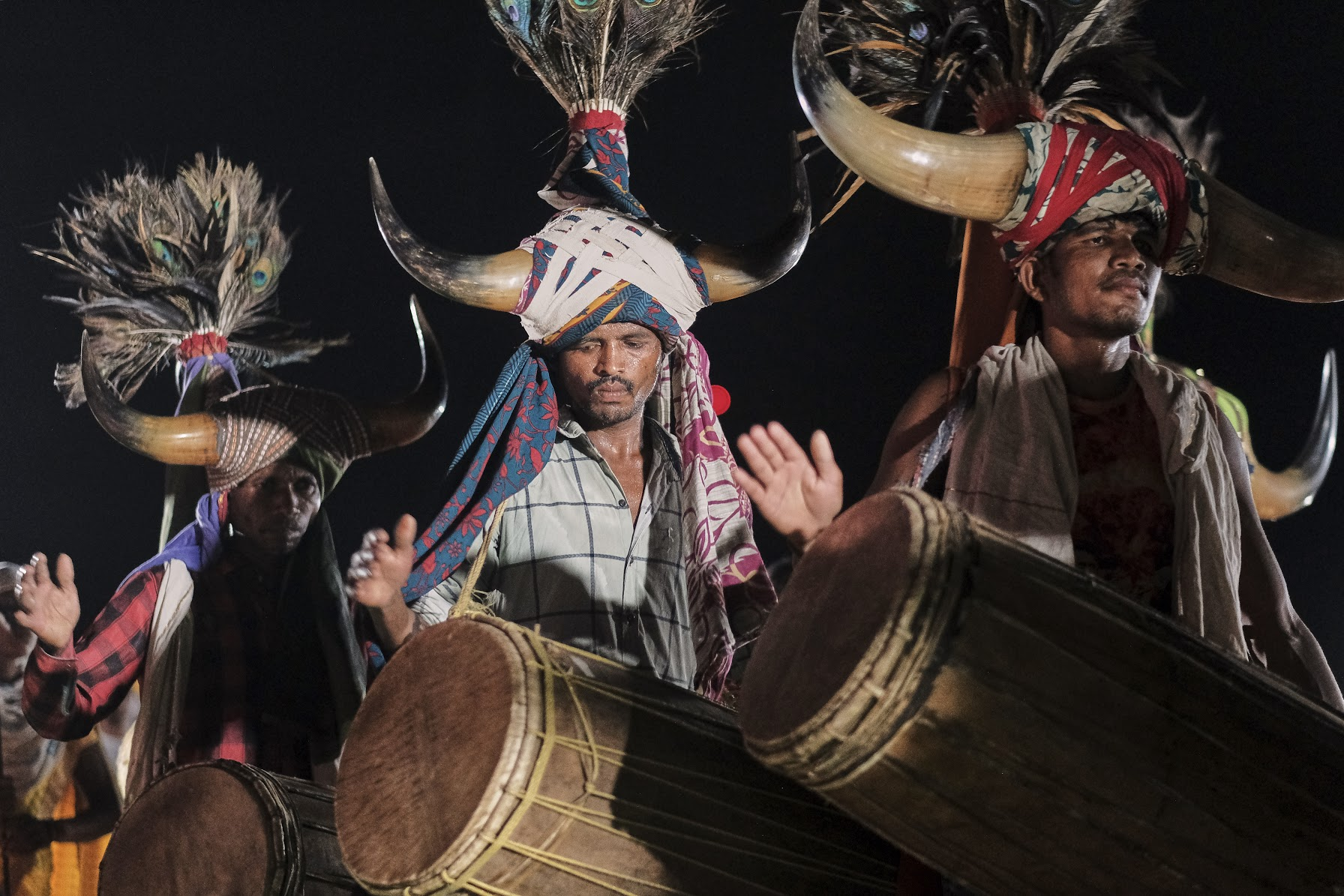
Tribals performing a traditional dance for the participants during Bastar Dialogue 5

==== Bastar Dialogue 5 ====
Bastar Dialogue 5 consisted of a series of four meetings in Abujhmarh, Chhattisgarh from 22 June 2019 till September 2019 with the purpose of granting community habitat rights to the primitive, vulnerable tribal groups (PVTGs) under section 3.1(e) of the Forest Rights Act.

=== 2020 ===
==== We All Bleed The Same ====
In an effort to disseminate information regarding menstrual hygiene while keeping in mind the lifestyle of tribal women, New Peace Process distributed gift packs consisting of one menstrual cup and two reusable cloth pads each to the tribal women of Bastar. A portion of these gift packs was also given to the women cadres engaged in the Maoist struggle as a peace offering. Since a switch to menstrual cups requires some hand holding in the start, the team prepared an audio-video clip and a brochure with detailed instructions on the usage and care of a menstrual cup in Chhattisgarhi, Halbi and Gondi dialect.

==== Victims Register ====
Modelled after similar initiatives in Colombia, the Victims Register is an extension of the New Peace Process aimed at documenting stories of victims affected by the Maoist conflict, to facilitate a path towards reconciliation. The aim is to create a digital database that documents the human rights violations and ensures that the victims are formally recognised, but also to eventually aids the government in providing reparations to the people. A dedicated phone line was opened for the register in January to allow residents, many of whom live in remote reaches, to call and record their testimonies. Posters are being circulated in response to which people are giving a missed call to the NGO and are then being contacted by volunteers and journalists to have their testimonies recorded. Victims are sharing their stories in the indigenous Gondi and Halbi languages. Residents are also being trained to record video interviews and share them using WhatsApp. The register’s accounts, backed by photos and multimedia content, have been made available for public viewing online on the website of the New Peace Process.
