= Marcus Perkins =

Marcus Perkins is a humanitarian photographer based in London. He has worked in over 90 countries since 1992, covering humanitarian, corporate and commercial assignments.

== Clients ==
Marcus Perkins has worked with a wide range of clients, including humanitarian organisations, multi-national corporations and independent schools.

== Being Untouchable exhibition ==
In October 2010, Marcus Perkins exhibited Being Untouchable, an intimate series of portraits depicting the lives of Dalits in India, in association with human rights organisation Christian Solidarity Worldwide, at HOST Gallery in London. The launch of the exhibition was addressed by poet Meena Kandasamy and publisher S. Anand.

In June 2011, Being Untouchable was exhibited in a prominent location in St Paul's Cathedral over a period of four weeks.

Being Untouchable received media coverage, including by the BBC, Prospect and the New Statesman, and one of the photographs was published by the Guardian for its 'Eyewitness' feature.
