= Durga Bai Vyam =

Indian painter (born 1973)

PS Durga Bai Vyam
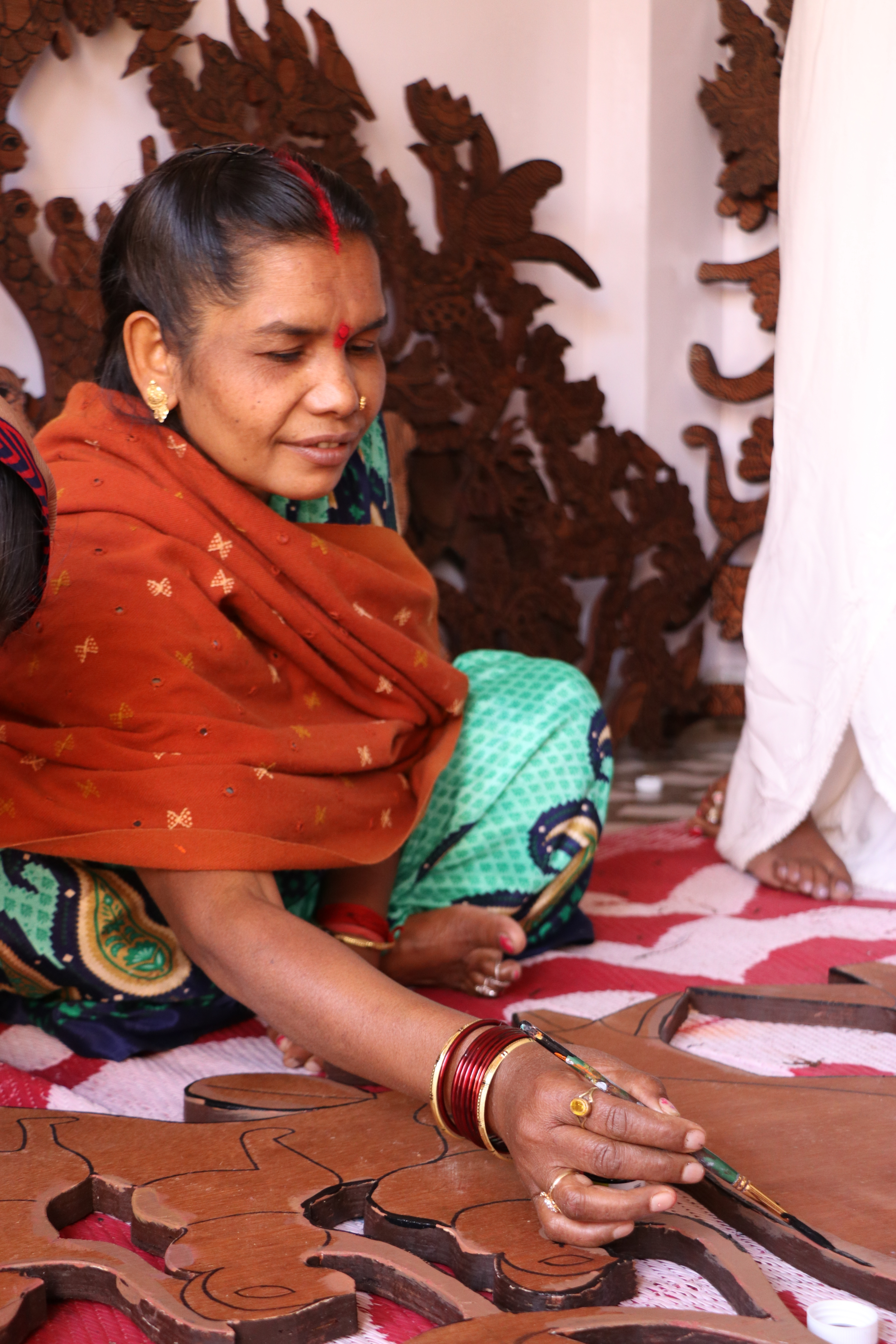
- Durga Bai Vyam painting
- Born: 1973 (age 52–53); Barbaspur, Madhya Pradesh, India
- Known for: Painting
- Spouse: Subhash Singh Vyam
- Children: Mansingh Vyam, Rajni Vyam, Roshni Vyam
- Awards: Padma Shri (2022)

Durga Bai Vyam (born in 1973) is an Indian artist. She lives in Bhopal and works in the Gond tradition of tribal art.

She has created paintings for several publications and exhibited her works widely. In 2022, she was awarded Padma Shri by the Government of India for her contributions in the field of arts.

== Early life ==
Durga Bai Vyam was born in Burbaspur, a village in Madhya Pradesh.

At the age of six, she learned the art of digna from her mother, a ritual of painting geometric patterns on the inner and outer walls and floors of the house during weddings and harvest festivals. Her early digna works were well appreciated by people in the community.

== Career ==
Listening to stories with her grandmother and mentoring under her mother contributed significantly to Durga Bai's art in the initial years. Durga Bai Vyam began her creative journey in 1996 at an artist's camp organized by Indira Gandhi Rashtriya Manav Sangrahalaya, Bhopal. At the age of 15, Durga Bai married Subhash Vyam, a clay and wood sculptor. Durga Bai's artistic career has flourished even further not only by her marriage to Subhash Vyam but also by the veteran Gond Artist, Jangarh Singh Shyam, her cousin. Durga Bai and Subash together take workshops and teach participants the integral elements of Gond painting while pointing out the changes brought by modernization in their medium of painting.

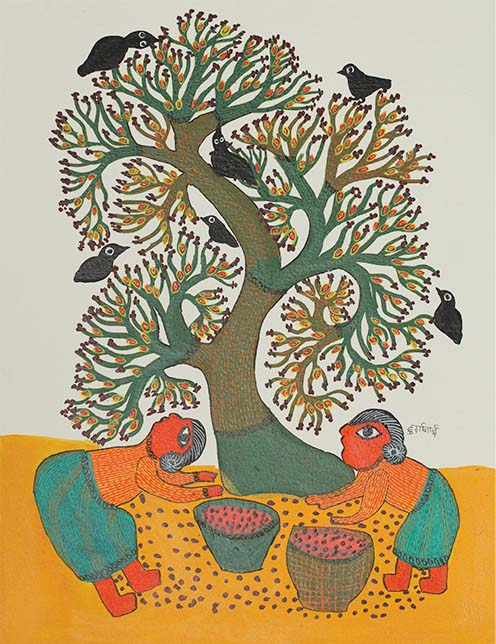
Gond painting by Durga Bai Vyam

Impressed by Durga Bai's skills, Jangarh Singh Shyam, encouraged and advised her not to repeat what they had done for years but use their skills to show new things. Her subjects are rooted in tribal folklore and mythology and are drawn mainly from the pantheon of the Gond Pradhan community and popular folklore. She also painted several goddesses: Ratmaimurkhuri, the guardian of the night; Maharalin Mata, who warded off ghouls from entering villages; Khero Mata, protector against evil people; Budi Mai, patroness of the harvest; and Kulsahinmata, a goddess invoked when crop was sown. Durga also painted the males gods, Bada Dev, the supreme god, and Chula Dev, who ensured that the household chulha (hearth) always burns.

"The themes I have always liked to paint are rivers, trees —especially the bamboo tree which is vital to life because from it is made Bada Dev's musical instrument bana and the bansuri, flute —Diwali celebrations, kanyadan, houses and children, animals such as tiger, deer, stag with antlers, peacock, bull, garden lizard, pig, birds sitting on top of trees while animals sit below."

In 1996, Anand Singh Shyam, a fellow Gond artist, invited her to exhibit her works at Bharat Bhavan in Madhya Pradesh. Since then, Durga Bai has notably had exhibitions in and around India and also abroad. Durga Bai did a series of paintings of aeroplanes in the Gond style to mark her first plane ride and her first visit abroad to the Frankfurt Book Fair. Each of her paintings is inspired by archetypal scenes of Gond Mythology, creating the unbridled lyricism and audacious imagination of her signature style.

In 2003, Vyam was invited to a workshop by Tara Publishing in Chennai, and has since been illustrating books. She has contributed to illustrate several art books like 'The Night Life of Trees', 'One, Two, Tree!', 'Sultana's Dream'. In 2011, Durga Bai and Subhash Vyam published a graphic biography of B. R. Ambedkar titled 'Bhimayana: Experiences of Untouchability' published by Navayana.

In the Kochi Muziris Biennale 2018, the artist couple had created an experimental graphic narrative on marine plywood giving the traditional Gond wall art another dimension.

== Awards and recognition ==
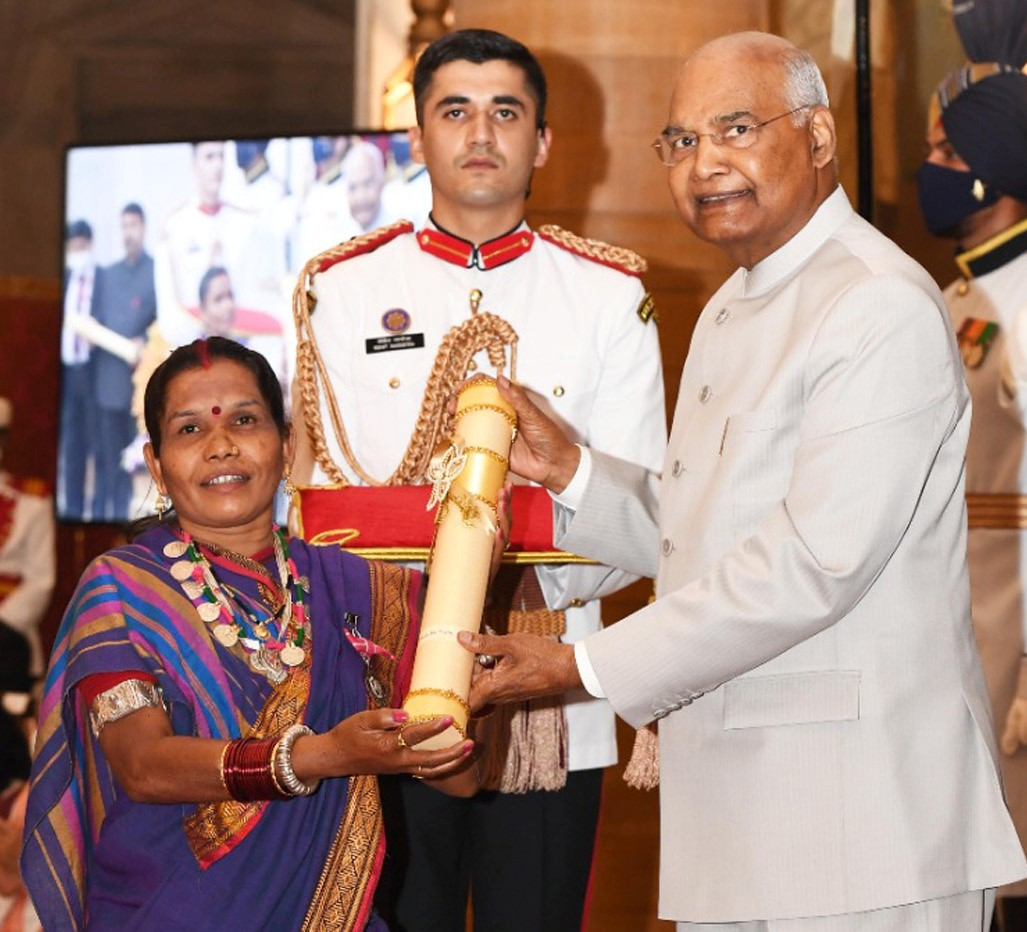
Durga Bai Vyam receiving Padma Shri from President Ram Nath Kovind

- 2004 - Handicraft Development Council
- 2006-2007 - Indira Gandhi National Centre for the Arts Scholarship
- 2009 - Rani Durgawati award for excellence in traditional painting
- Katha Chitrakala Runner's up Award, for her children's book, "Mai and her Friends"
- 2008 - Bologna Ragazzi Award for illustrating book along with Ram Singh Urveti and Bhajju Shyam titled, "The Night Life of Trees", published by Tara Books
- 2022 - Padma Shri
