= The Orders Were to Rape You =

2021 book by Meena Kandasamy

The Orders Were to Rape You: Tigresses in the Tamil Eelam Struggle
- First edition
- Author: Meena Kandasamy
- Language: English
- Publisher: Navayana Publishing
- Publication date: February 2021
- Pages: 104

The Orders Were to Rape You: Tigresses in the Tamil Eelam Struggle is a book by Meena Kandasamy about the violence, particularly sexual violence, faced by the female fighters of Liberation Tigers of Tamil Eelam after the end of the Sri Lankan Civil War. She narrates the suffering faced by first-person accounts by women who moved abroad to Malaysia and Indonesia after the end of the Sri Lankan Civil war. She narrates the suffering of a woman married to an LTTE member who had no direct connection with the movement, she speaks of the questioning, harassment, and torture by Army personnel and female fighter of the LTTE who narrated her ordeal of being repeatedly raped by army personnel and contemplated suicide but decided against for the sake of her child during there detention in camps after the end of the Civil War in 2009. In the other part she writes about the resistance poems written by the female fighters.
