= Venkat Shyam =

Indian multimedia artist (born 1970)

Venkat Raman Singh Shyam
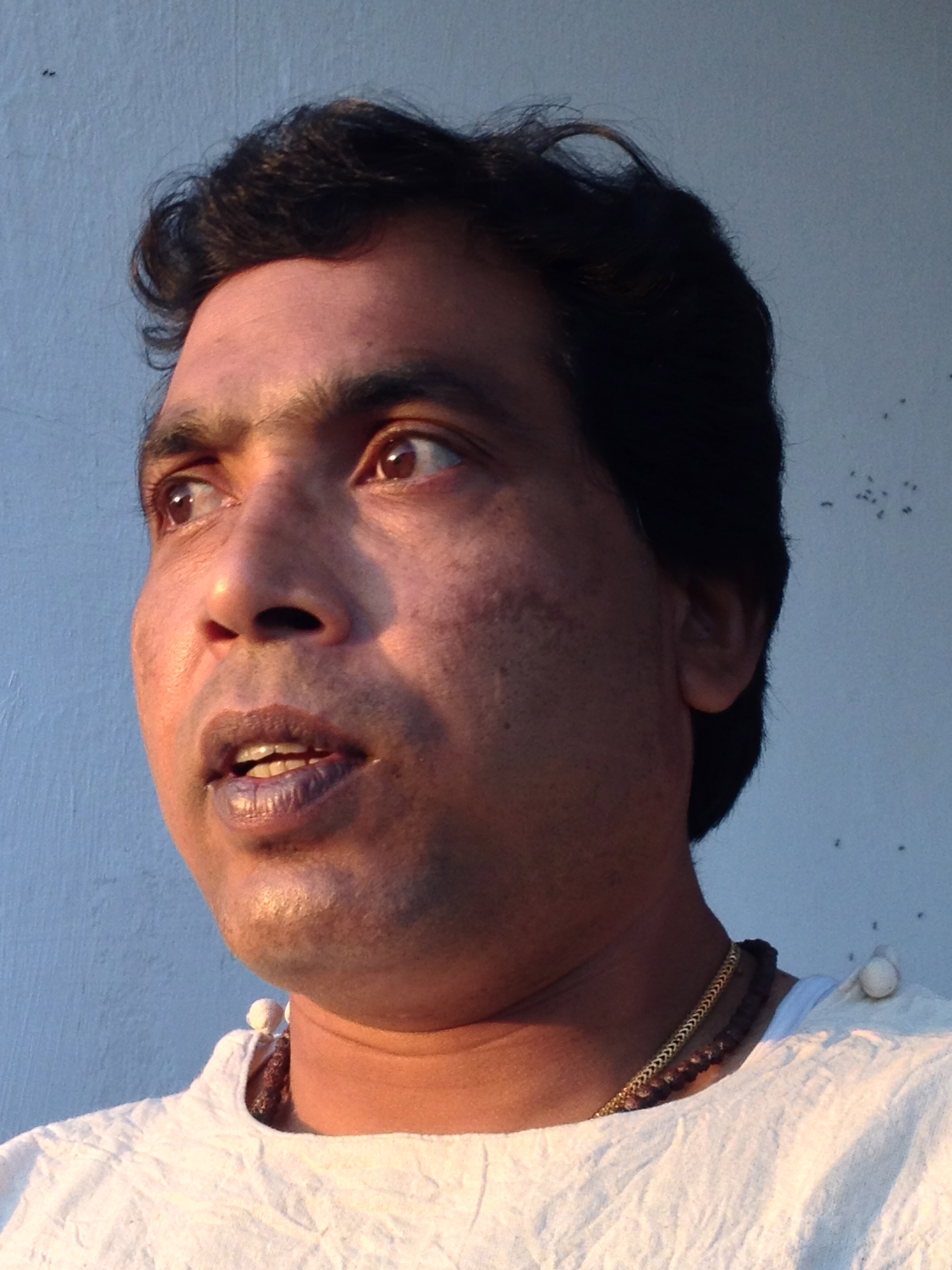
- Born: Sijhora, Mandla district, Eastern Madhya Pradesh
- Known for: Painting, drawing, sculpture, mural, etching, mixed media and animation
- Spouse: Saroj Shyam
- Awards: Rajya Hasta Shilpa Puraskar

Venkat Raman Singh Shyam (born 28 October 1970) is a contemporary Indian artist who works with murals, etchings, mixed media and animation. Venkat has travelled extensively and exhibited his work in India and the world over. He was awarded the Rajya Hasta Shilpa Puraskar by the Government of Madhya Pradesh in 2002. He was also the coordinator for an animated film on a Gond folktale made by Tara Douglas which won the Tallest Story Competition Trophy at the Inverness Film Festival, Scotland, in 2007.

== Background ==
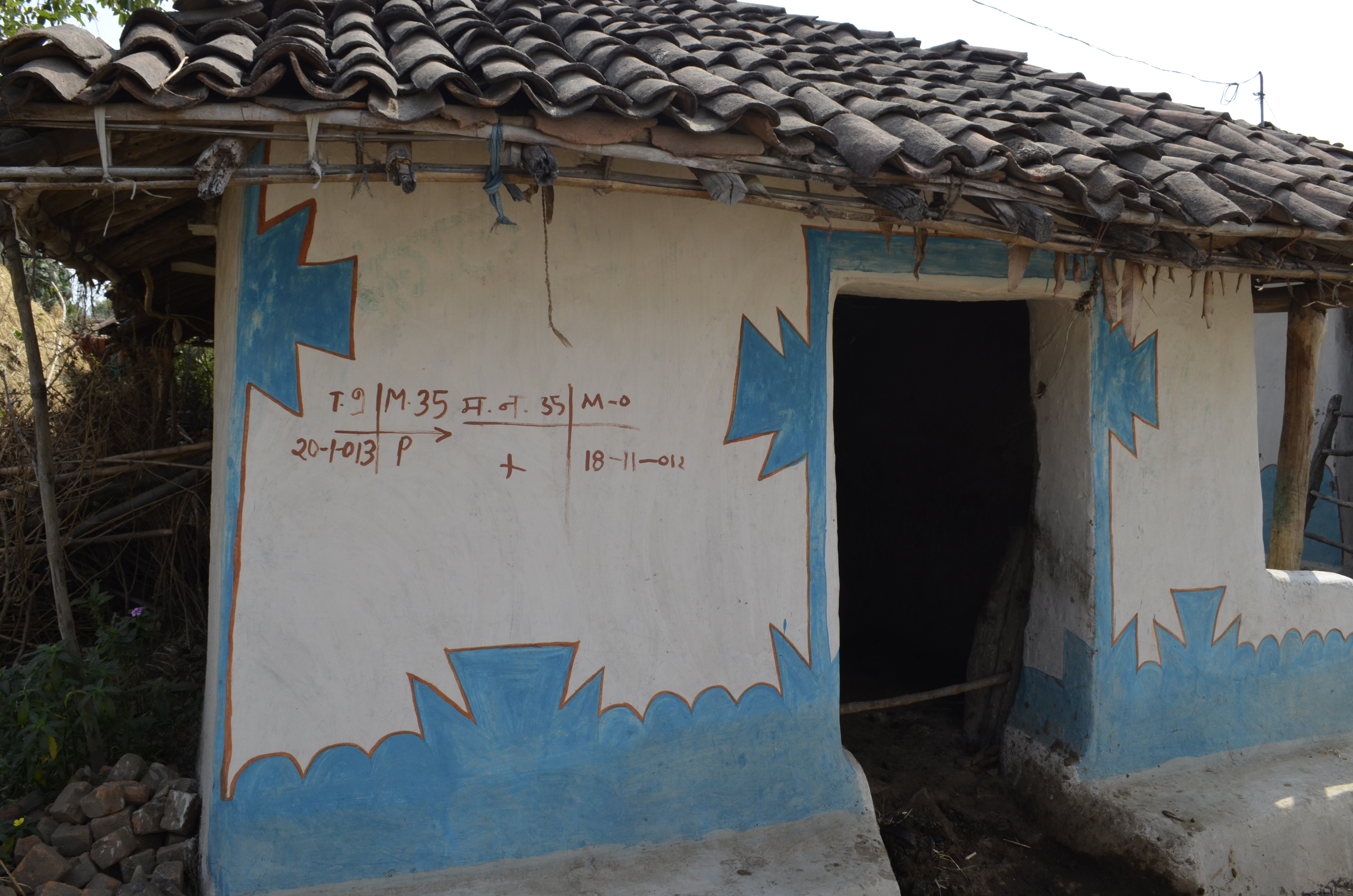
Mural on the wall of a buffalo shed, Sijhora, 2013

Venkat Raman Singh Shyam was born into a Pardhan Gond family in the village of Sijhora, situated 80 km from Patangarh in eastern Madhya Pradesh. Venkat's father, Pyare Lal Shyam, worked as a peon in the schools of Sijhora.

Venkat lived with his family in Sijhora till 1986, when his uncle, the famous Gond artist Jangarh Singh Shyam visited them. Jangarh urged young Venkat to join him in Bhopal and train in his studio. After initial reluctance, the sixteen-year old accompanied him to the city and lived with Jangarh and his mother Aadhara Bai in Jangarh's house in Professors’ Colony, Bhopal. He worked as his apprentice for three years.

Around this time, Venkat also developed his own figural style as he began painting signboards for a meagre fifty rupees per day. Eventually, an altercation with Aadhara Bai led Venkat to leave his uncle's house for Delhi where he worked as domestic help in a police officer's household for some time until he managed to escape the exploitative conditions with a group of painters. Soon, a relative introduced him to the artist Jagdish Swaminathan— Jangarh's mentor and the first director of Bharat Bhavan, Bhopal.

In 1993, Venkat left Delhi due to bad health and financial hardship. He briefly went back to Bhopal, and then to Sijhora where his family forced him to get married. Shortly after, he came back to Bhopal. In 2008, Venkat was witness to the terrorist attack on the Taj Hotel in Colaba, Mumbai. His experiences led to a sixteen-painting series on the event.

His wife, Saroj Shyam, who hails from the village Rasoi, is also an artist who grew up close to the Baiga tribe and is as aware of their stories and legends as she is with Gond myths. Saroj primarily makes Dighna on paper, the traditional patterns painted on the walls of Gond homes.

== Career ==
Venkat Raman Singh Shyam took up several jobs to make a living before he became a professional artist—all of which influence his art in different ways. By the time of his introduction to Jagdish Swaminathan, he had worked as a footloose labourer, domestic help, signboard artist and house painter. Circumstances also forced him to ply a cycle rickshaw in Delhi.

Venkat has been drawing with pencil and charcoal from an early age. After a long stretch as a signboard painter, he finally found his break in 1998. Jangarh sent both Venkat and Bhajju Shyam—another Pardhan Gond artist, to Pondicherry to meet Hervé Perdriolle, a French art critic and curator of Outsider Art Gallery passionate about Gond art.

Venkat then worked with the Development Commissioner for Handicrafts in Delhi and produced greeting cards for the 2000 millennial celebrations in Khajuraho. He also exhibited his work at the American embassy in Delhi and sold his art through the Handicrafts Development Corporation in Madhya Pradesh. He was part of the group exhibition ‘Anadi’ organized by National Gallery of Modern Art, Mumbai. In 2004, he worked with the Scottish company called West Highland Animation where he helped produce the imagery for an animated film for children. In April 2009, he did a solo exhibition at the Indira Gandhi National Museum of Mankind in Bhopal. It was a series of sixteen paintings based on his experience as a witness to the 2008 Mumbai terrorist attacks. In 2013, Shyam's works were exhibited at “Sakahàn: International Indigenous Art” at the National Gallery of Canada, in Ottawa. Called the “largest-ever global survey of contemporary indigenous art”, ‘Sakahàn’, meaning ‘to light [a fire]’ in the language of the Algonquin peoples of Canada, featured artworks by more than 80 artists from 16 countries and six continents who interrogated the theme of what it means to be ‘indigenous’ in the present world.

Venkat is currently working on a graphic autobiography titled Finding My Way in collaboration with S. Anand, publisher of Navayana. His latest exhibition, along with his wife Saroj Shyam's works, is forthcoming at the Radford University Art Museum in Virginia, USA.

== Style ==
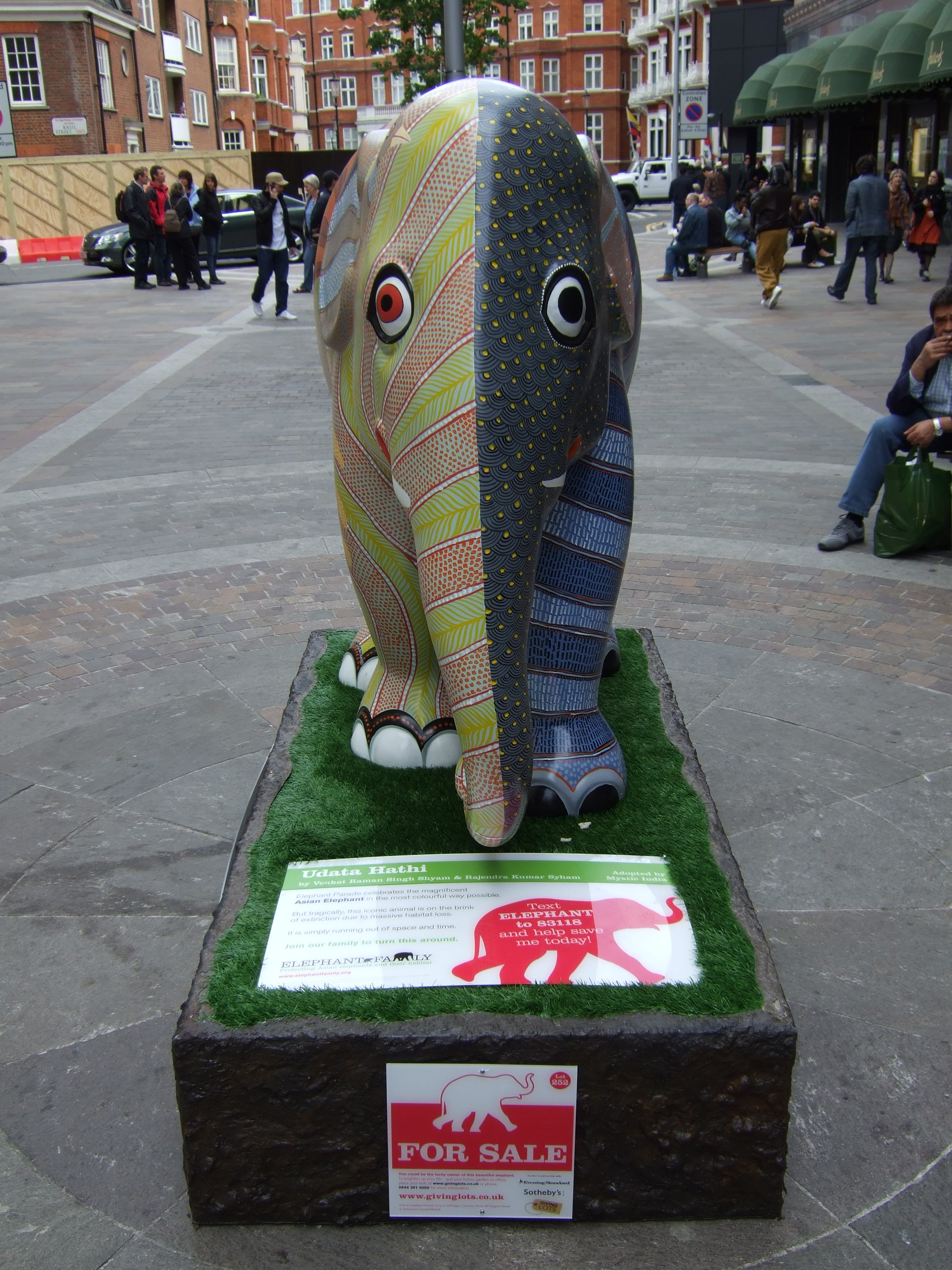
Shyam's design in the Elephant Parade London 2010

Venkat Raman Singh Shyam is a second-generation Pardhan Gond painter. As such, his style is heavily influenced by Jangarh Singh Shyam’s style—also called ‘Jangarh Kalam’ and the bhittachitra and digna style of painting found in Gond homes coupled with his own response to the contemporary world.

During childhood, Venkat drew with pencils and charcoal. However, charcoal is considered inauspicious among the Gonds and this led to discouragement from his community. While working as a professional signboard artist, he was exposed to Bollywood film-poster style of painting. In his early years in Bhopal, Venkat developed a visual language comprising vivid colours and broad bands of diagonal shading divided by narrow black-and-white striped bands known as lahr and lahrdaar—‘waves’ and ‘choppy waves’. Venkat still uses acrylic colours for his paintings.

As a young artist, Venkat loved the huge 10’x10’ canvases and the use of poster colours. Paintbrushes that came in various sizes also fascinated him. His first painting was of the goddess Khero Mai, a protector-deity of the village to whom he had prayed before leaving for Bhopal. When Jangarh saw the painting and called him a ‘donkey’, Venkat knew his uncle was pleased with his work.

Venkat continues to use acrylic colours for his paintings. He has experimented with ink and paper too, retelling Gond myths and stories of deities like Bara Deo and Dharti Dai. He described the evolution of the media used in Gond art and its increasingly urban existence in an interview: “Earlier, we used mice hair in place of a brush, while limestone or charcoal were our colour mediums. Now, we use thin brushes and special pens to draw, and water, oil and acrylic mediums as colours.”
