= I Could Not Be Hindu =

2019 memoir by Bhanwar Meghwanshi

I Could Not Be Hindu: The Story of a Dalit in the RSS
- Book cover
- Author: Bhanwar Meghwanshi
- Translator: Nivedita Menon
- Language: Hindi; English
- Genre: Memoir; Autobiography; Non-fiction
- Publisher: Navarun Prakashan; Navayana Publishing
- Publication date: 2019; 2020
- Publication place: India
- Media type: Print
- Pages: 240
- ISBN: 9788189059934
- Website: navayana.org/products/i-could-not-be-hindu-2/

I Could Not Be Hindu: The Story of a Dalit in the RSS is a memoir by Bhanwar Meghwanshi, a former member of the Rashtriya Swayamsevak Sangh (RSS), published in Hindi as Main Ek Karsevak Tha in 2019 by Navarun Prakashan and translated into English by Nivedita Menon in 2020 by Navayana Publishing. The book chronicles Meghwanshi's experiences with caste discrimination within the RSS and his subsequent embrace of Ambedkarite ideology, offering a critique of the organisation's casteist practices and Hindutva ideology.

== Content ==
The memoir recounts Meghwanshi's tenure in the RSS from 1987 to 1991, starting at age 13 in Bhilwara, Rajasthan, where he rose to district chief and participated in the 1990 Ramjanmabhoomi movement.

It details instances of caste discrimination, such as senior members refusing to eat food cooked at his home and throwing it into a drain, and his denial of pracharak status due to his Dalit identity.

The book critiques the RSS's Brahminical hierarchy, its use of Dalits as "foot soldiers" for Hindu Rashtra, and its portrayal of B.R. Ambedkar as a Hindu nationalist. Meghwanshi describes his disillusionment, particularly after the 1992 Babri Masjid demolition, and his shift to Ambedkarite politics, influenced by Ambedkar's Annihilation of Caste and Riddles in Hinduism.

== Reception ==
I Could Not Be Hindu has been praised for its lucid prose and ethnographic insight into the RSS's caste dynamics. Suraj Yengde, writing in The Hindu, called it an "essential read" and a "confessional paradox", comparing it to classic slave narratives like Frederick Douglass's autobiography.

Christophe Jaffrelot in The Wire described it as a "unique testimony" exposing Hindutva's contradictions, valuable for scholars and activists.

Business Standard noted its rarity as a former swayamsevak's account, highlighting its critique of RSS's homogenous Hindu society project.

The Caravan emphasised its exposé of RSS's glorification of violence and caste hierarchy.

Telegraph India praised it as an "indispensable" account of RSS's counter-revolution against republican India.

The book has been endorsed by public figures like Perumal Murugan and Shashi Tharoor.

Its publication coincided with the 2019 Supreme Court verdict on Ayodhya dispute, amplifying its relevance in debates on caste and Hindutva.

A Tamil translation was released in 2023.

== Cultural impact ==
The memoir is considered a significant contribution to Dalit literature, akin to Bama's Karukku, for its insider critique of RSS's casteism.

It has sparked discussions on the intersection of caste and Hindutva, with scholars like Yengde and Jaffrelot citing its ethnographic value.
