= Bhimayana =

Indian graphic novel

'Bhimayana'
- Cover of the English version of Bhimayana
- Publisher: Navayana

Creative team
- Creators: Durgabai Vyam; Subhash Vyam; Srividya Natarajan; S. Anand

Original publication
- Date of publication: 2011
- ISBN: 9788189059170

Bhimayana: Incidents in the Life of Bhimrao Ramji Ambedkar is a graphic biography of Bhimrao Ramji Ambedkar published in 2011 by Navayana and was hailed by CNN as being among the top five political comic books. It was created by artists Durgabai Vyam, Subhash Vyam and writers Srividya Natarajan and S. Anand. It depicts the experiences of caste discrimination and resistance that Bhimrao Ambedkar recorded in his autobiographical illustrations, later compiled and edited in Babasaheb Ambedkar: Writings and Speeches by Vasant Moon under the title "Waiting for a Visa". It is one of India's top selling graphic books.

Bhimayana has been lauded for its use of Pardhan Gond art to signify the experiences of social discrimination faced by Ambedkar. It uses digna (images originally painted on the walls and floors of Pardhan Gonds’ houses) patterns and nature imagery. These paintings have been done traditionally by Gond people. Digna paintings have been brought to the notice of the modern world by artists like Jangarh Singh Shyam. According to Jeremy Stoll, affiliate faculty at Metropolitan State University of Denver, ‘It is most remarkable for demonstrating the strength of Indian comics culture and providing a strong example of where folk and popular culture overlap’. In 2011, Bhimayana was included in the book 1001 Comics to Read Before You Die.

It has been published under the title Ambedkar: The Fight for Justice in the UK and the United States by Tate Publishing in 2013. The book has been translated into several languages including Malayalam, Hindi, Tamil, Marathi, Telugu, Kannada, Korean and French.

== Background ==
Bhimayana is based on incidents narrated in B.R. Ambedkar's autobiographical notes. These notes were written in 1935 with the objective of disseminating information about the practice of untouchability to foreigners. He documented events from his own life and others’ to provide an idea of the caste discrimination against dalits that is sanctioned under Hinduism. Navayana published them as Ambedkar: Autobiographical Notes in 2003.

== Sectional Summary ==
=== Dedication and Foreword ===
The book is dedicated to Jangarh Singh Shyam, a pioneer in contemporary Pardhan Gond art. He is credited by Udayan Vajpeyi to be the creator of a new school of art called Jangarh Kalam. He encouraged and guided Durgabai and Subhash Vyam, along with many other members of the Pardhan Gond community, to become artists. He was also Subhash Vyam's brother-in-law.

In the foreword, art critic John Berger, most famous for his 1972 essay "Ways of Seeing", commends the refreshing form of story-telling that the book uses. Of it, he says, ‘No more proscenium arch. No more rectangular framing or unilinear time. No more profiled individuals. Instead, a conference of corporeal experiences across generations, full of pain and empathy, and nurtured by a complicity and endurance that can outlive the Market’. He believes that such texts will make readers more vested in the story and its message.

The graphic account begins with a frame story of an unnamed character complaining about ‘these damn job quotas for Backward and Scheduled Castes!’ who is immediately challenged by another character leading to a conversation about the history of caste atrocities in India. He is advised to read about Ambedkar to understand what happened at Khairlanji.

The book then moves on to the narrative of Ambedkar's life in Books I, II and III.

=== Book I – Water ===
‘Water’ sets the scene in 1901, on an ordinary day in Ambedkar's life as a 10-year-old Mahar schoolboy. He is humiliated at the hands of the Brahmin teacher and the peon who, paranoid about the possibility of contamination, refuse him water. Young Bhim goes back home where he asks his aunt why he cannot drink from the tap like other boys, despite being cleaner than upper-caste students. The text also juxtaposes Ambedkar's own lack of access to water at school with his father's work in Goregaon, which entails ‘helping build a water tank for famine stricken people who would die if it weren't for his work’.

Young Bhim along with his siblings is invited to stay with his father in Masur. They get off the train to find that no one has come to receive them and seek the station master's help. As soon as they reveal that they are Mahars, the stationmaster turns hostile. He finds them a cart-ride on the condition that they pay double. Eventually they find their father's house. It turns out that his secretary had forgotten to inform him of their arrival.

The narrative voice moves back to the frame story here, and the unnamed storyteller concludes that Ambedkar said it was because of the secretary's mistake that he had learnt ‘the most unforgettable lesson about untouchability’. The section ends with an account of Ambedkar's Mahad satyagraha against lack of access to water from the Chavadar Tank.

=== Book II – Shelter ===
This section is set in 1917, after Ambedkar returns from Columbia University to work for the Maharaja of Baroda who had sponsored his education. It starts with him boarding a train to Baroda and engaging in a conversation with a Brahmin. Soon Ambedkar realizes that his status as an untouchable, although forgotten by him during his stay abroad, is still an enormous issue in India.

In Baroda, he is subsequently denied entry into a Hindu hotel due to his caste status. Unable to find proper accommodation, he shifts into a decrepit Parsi inn but is thrown out after a few days. As he attempts to find shelter, his friends evade helping him citing problems at home, forcing him to wait in the Kamathi Baug public garden and subsequently, leave for Bombay.

The section ends with the narrative voice of the frame story re-emerging and highlighting caste based discrimination practiced by ‘liberal’ city dwellers. An article from The Hindu titled "Dalit Siblings Thrashed by Landlord" is also put forward to illustrate the difficulties faced by dalits while trying to find shelter in urban areas as well.

=== Book III – Travel ===
This section is set in Aurangabad, 1934, wherein Ambedkar travels to Daulatabad with a group of political workers of Mahar and other untouchable castes. Ambedkar reminisces about his experience during his trip to Bombay in 1929, when the untouchables of Chalisgaon sent their nephew to drive Ambedkar to their house on a Tonga because all the Tonga-drivers refused to give Ambedkar, a Mahar, a ride. The driver was unskilled and they meet with an accident, but receive prompt medical aid. Ambedkar then confronts the harsh truth that in a graded Indian society, a highly educated and renowned dalit will continue to be oppressed and deprived of dignity. The section mentions cases of dalits being denied medical care by hospitals. The narrative then shifts to the present, where Ambedkar and his colleagues are prevented from drinking from the water-tank at the Daulatabad fort by a mob of Muslims.

The section ends with the characters from the frame story discussing Ambedkar's contribution to social equality and justice in India as both an agitator and an architect of the Constitution. The polemic of Gandhi versus Ambedkar towards the end brings to the reader's attention that, unlike Gandhi, Ambedkar's was a far more universal struggle against injustice perpetrated by home-grown casteist oppressors.

=== Book IV – The Art of Bhimayana ===
This section focuses on the makers of Bhimayana through the same image-text language that has been used throughout the previous sections. This chapter is narrated through the voices of Durgabai Vyam and Subhash Vyam. They describe their own background, community, and the importance of Ambedkar in their own lives.

This is followed by an afterword by S. Anand, which explores the process of making Bhimayana and the sources that were used to write the story. In the process, he points out the role of Pardhan Gond bards as the tradition-bearers of their communities in central India, arguing for their continued relevance through the cross-mediation of their performance narratives. He points out the communal nature of the Vyams’ creative process and describes the importance of recognizing traditional crafts-persons as artists in their own right. The title, Anand suggests, is a pun on Ramayana, the Hindu epic tale of Lord Rama.

Anand concludes by describing the collaborative process and how he and the Vyams constantly renegotiated the story itself, incorporating new characters and a greater presence of nature, as well as taking some small liberties with the stories’ source material for the sake of the larger narrative. This section concludes with a focus on the need to address caste and its continued presence as discrimination in India.

== Artwork ==
Nature imagery is present throughout the book—fortresses are fierce beasts; trains are snakes; the road is a peacock's long neck; the handle of a water pump turns into an elephant's trunk. The first section of the book, which deals with the right to water, is full of water-based imagery—when the young Ambedkar is thirsty, his torso turns into a fish; and when he urges a crowd to stand up for their rights, the speakers morph into showers sprinkling water onto the audience. A section on shelter has the recurring imagery of the banyan tree and its many twisted roots. Even the speech bubbles have significance—harsh or prejudiced words are given a tail like a scorpion's to evoke their sting. Gentle words are encased in bubbles shaped like birds, and unspoken thoughts are given an icon to denote the mind's eye.

The pages are not formally structured and digna patterns divide the story into loose frames for a khulla (open) visual imagery. Metaphors of carnivores and herbivores are used for Brahmins and dalits respectively. The speech-bubbles carry clues about narrative sympathy—the speech bubble issuing from young Bhim is in the shape of a bird, while the speech-bubble issuing from the peon is in the shape of a scorpion. This technique is used throughout the book. Anthropomorphism is also used as the train and the tap are portrayed to be live beings.

== Reception ==
Bhimayana was reviewed widely by magazines and newspapers such as the Times Literary Supplement, the Journal of Folklore Research, CNN and The Hindu and got extremely positive response.

The Journal of Folklore Research called the fusion of a political narrative and Gond painting in Bhimayana ‘innovative and striking’, locating it in the stream of international graphic-journalism that uses the graphic medium to engage with political narratives. It also discussed the multi-layered visual language of the book, where the form of a single element on the page often becomes the site of another element, such as Ambedkar's face on page 68 which is also the park where Ambedkar took shelter before leaving for Bombay.

Journalist, curator and writer Paul Gravett has included Bhimayana in 1001 Comics You Must Read Before You Die. He was present at the Tate launch of the book in London and has discussed it in his essay on Indian comics. He discusses the art at length, saying, ‘The pages I have seen are wonderful, their figures and clothes drawn in intense patterning, faces mainly in profile with large single eyes, and their pages divided into panels by curving, decorated borders. Accusing, pointing fingers are repeated in one panel. Even the balloons have shapes and tails uniquely their own: bird-like outlines for regular speech; a scorpion’s sting as the tail for venomous dialogue; and a distinctive eye in the thought bubbles to represent the mind’s eye. What better art to retell this tale today?’

According to The Hindu: ‘To call Bhimayana a "book" would amount to a trivialisation—it is a magnificent work of breathtaking art that symbolises the soul-stirring biography of an exceptional leader’.

Amitava Kumar, writer and journalist, reviewing it on JJ Books, recommended the book highly, saying, ‘At the end, you feel you have gained knowledge but you need to enter, spiritually and politically, into the book’s larger world to become a participant in a new world’.

In 2014, it became part of a compulsory paper in the English undergraduate degree syllabus.
