= Nivedita Menon =

Feminist, Political Scientist

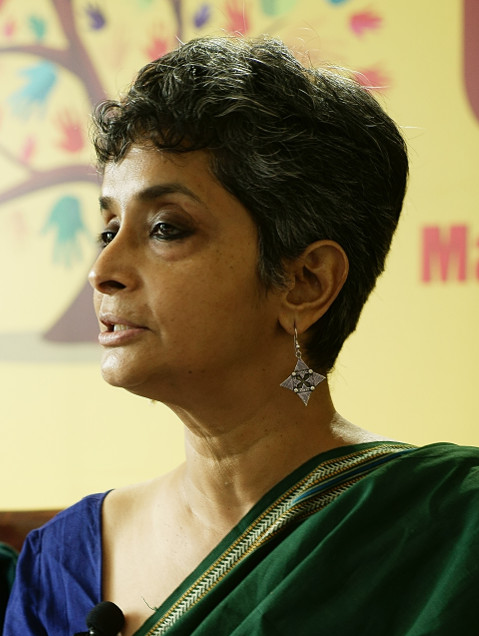
- Nivedita Menon in May 2015
- Born: 1960 (age 65–66); Poona
- Occupations: Writer, professor

Nivedita Menon (born 1960) is a writer and a professor of political thought at Jawaharlal Nehru University, Delhi. She previously taught at Lady Shri Ram College and the Department of Political Science at Delhi University.

== Scholarly career ==
Menon is a feminist scholar who has taught at the International Studies School of Jawaharlal Nehru University (JNU) in Delhi since 2009. She superannuated in November 2025. Before moving to JNU she was a teacher at Lady Shri Ram College for 15 years, and the political science department at Delhi University for seven years. Menon says that the Indian feminist movement she was exposed to in college, as well as the writings of global feminists, helped her evolve a better consciousness with respect to issues of sexuality and politics. She was greatly influenced by the work of global feminists like Betty Friednan, Germaine Greer and Gloria Steinem.

Menon has written or edited several books about feminism and politics, including the 2004 volume Recovering Subversion: Feminist Politics Beyond the Law. She also writes on current issues in the journal Economic and Political Weekly, the online news blog kafila.org, and several newspapers.

=== Reception ===
Seeing Like a Feminist, released in 2012, received favourable reviews. It also had high sales, partly due to uproar following the 2012 Delhi gang rape. The title of the book is a play upon the title of Seeing Like a State by James C. Scott. A review in The Hindu said that the book "[dissected] social institutions, policy, and common ideas to explain the many ways the process of “gendering” occurs — here making a distinction between ‘sex’ as the biological characteristics and ‘gender’ as the set of cultural meanings that are arrived at over time." Writing in the journal Economic and Political Weekly, feminist scholar Mary John said; "Written in a highly engrossing style, [the book] takes on very serious issues while also frequently making the reader smile. Nivedita Menon has managed to condense some of the most complex challenges facing the women’s movement in contemporary India and elsewhere in the form of a series of short reflections that are organised within six chapters." A review in The Guardian noted that "Menon succeeds in shattering some deeply-engrained myths, and her efficient gathering of the intersectional strands makes it a breezy but sharp read."

== Political activism ==
Menon is known for her staunch opposition to nuclear power. Menon has commented on the different portrayals of the Kashmir conflict within India and outside it, and has criticized the Armed Forces Special Powers Act.

=== Describing Uniform civil code as anti-Muslim ===
In an article published in The Hindu in 2016, Menon criticised the Uniform Civil Code. She wrote that, "the talk of a Uniform Civil Code has nothing to do with gender justice. It has entirely to do with a Hindu nationalist agenda to 'discipline' Muslims". She went on to describe the Code as "a stick to beat Muslims with" and claimed that the "Muslim Personal Law is already modern", as it already provides women the right to property and recognises marriage as a civil contract, unlike Hindu marriages which were largely considered sacrament, until recently.

=== JNU protests ===
During the protests in JNU in March 2016, Nivedita Menon made a speech titled "Nation, a daily plebiscite" in which she discussed nation formation, nationalist aspirations, and Kashmir's accession to the Indian Union. The lecture was part of a series about nationalism. The ABVP activist and students union joint secretary Saurabh Kumar Sharma filed a police complaint accusing her of having made anti-national statements to the effect that "Everyone knows that India is illegally occupying Kashmir. It is said the world over. Everybody accepts (this)". She was also accused of saying, "Manipur and Kashmir have been illegally occupied by the Indian state". A video clip from her lecture was highlighted by the news channel Zee News, which labelled Menon "anti-national". In the clip Nivedita said that " Hindu Society is the most violent, to the root violent society in the world". The incident led to her being targeted for her views by people and student organisations.

Menon claimed that her actual statement was, "We [Indians] must accept that Kashmiris' call for freedom is absolutely justified". She also said "We know that people the world over think that India is illegally occupying Kashmir". She also said, "If people are raising slogans for azadi (freedom), shouldn’t this be looked at in the context of India being seen as an imperialist country internationally?". She also highlighted the fact that Kashmiris equate "India" and Indian nationalism with militarism and abuse of power. Menon later stated that she had not said anything anti-national.

The video of her speech and the reactions to it also led to Menon receiving widespread support online. A number of activists published a statement saying that Menon was being vilified by the media and the police, and that the complaints against her constituted harassment. Friends and students of Menon created a Facebook page in her support. The controversy led to her being described as a figure of dissent against the Hindu right.

=== Views on Hindutva ===
Menon describes India's National Education Policy as advancing Hindutva culture and aiming to "saffronise" education. She has also argued that Hindutva is a "Brahminical political project" which denies that India is a country of numerous minority communities rather than one Hindu majority, and that it seeks to assimilate, marginalise, or eliminate non-Brahmanical groups.

=== Views on Palestine ===
Menon has stated multiple times that she fully supports the Boycott, Divestment and Sanctions movement and Palestinian independence from the beginning. In October 2022, she was among the South Asian scholars who signed a statement describing Israel's actions in Gaza as a "genocide" and identifying what they called long standing affinities between Zionism, Hindutva and US empire. Menon characterizes a contentious parallels between Hindu nationalism and Zionism as ethno-majoritarian ideologies and claimed that public expression of solidarity with Palestinians has faced restrictions in India.

== Personal life ==
Menon is known as 'Nivi' to most of her students and peers. She belongs to an upper-caste middle-class family, and was brought up in different parts of India, including Mumbai, Kolkata and Delhi. Menon's sister is the queer activist, stand-up comedian, and gender and sexuality consultant Pramada Menon, who co-founded the organization Creating Resources for Empowerment in Action (CREA). Their brother is Dilip Menon, who is a historian at the University of Witwatersrand, South Africa.

== Selected works ==
- Power and Contestation: India since 1989 (Global History of the Present) (2007).
- Seeing Like a Feminist (2012).
- Recovering Subversion: Feminist Politics Beyond The Law (2004).
- Gender And Politics In India
- Sexualities (collected volume)
- I Could Not Be Hindu (translation)

== Awards and honours ==
In 1994, Nivedita Menon won the A. K. Ramanujan Award (Instituted by Katha) for translation from Hindi and Malayalam into English 1994.
