= Meena Kandasamy =

Indian writer, translator and activist (born 1984)

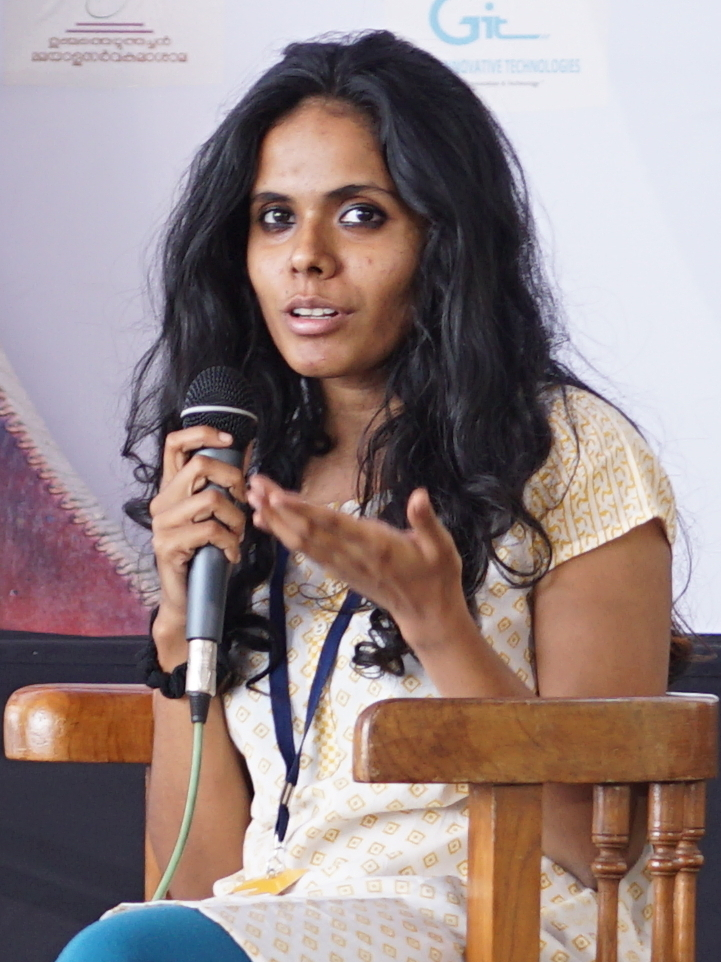
- Meena in 2016
- Born: Ilavenil Kandasamy; 1984 (age 41–42); Tamil Nadu, India
- Education: B.A. (Madras) (2004), M.A. (Madras) (2006), Ph.D. (Anna) (2010)
- Alma mater: Madras University and Anna University, Chennai (Tamil Nadu)
- Occupations: Writer, activist, translator
- Parent(s): Drs. W. B. Vasantha Kandaswamy (mother) and K. Kandaswamy (father)
- Writing career
- Pen name: Meena
- Period: Twenty-first century
- Genre: Indian writing in English
- Subjects: Social justice and human rights
- Notable work: The Orders Were to Rape You (2021)
- Notable awards: 2022 Hermann Kesten Prize
- Movement: Dalit literature
- Website: www.kandasamy.co.uk

Ilavenil Meena Kandasamy (born October 12, 1984) is an Indian poet, fiction writer, translator and activist from Chennai, Tamil Nadu, India.

Meena published two collections of poetry, Touch (2006) and Ms. Militancy (2010). From 2001 to 2002, she edited The Dalit, a bi-monthly alternative English magazine of the Dalit Media Network.

She represented India at the University of Iowa's International Writing Program and was a Charles Wallace India Trust Fellow at the University of Kent, Canterbury, United Kingdom. She writes columns for platforms including Outlook India and The Hindu.

== Early life and education ==
Born in 1984 to Tamil parents, both university professors, she developed an early interest in poetry, and later adopted the name Meena. She completed a Doctorate of Philosophy in Socio-linguistics from Anna University, Chennai. She began writing poetry at the age of 17 and began translating books by Dalit writers and leaders into English.

== Professional career ==
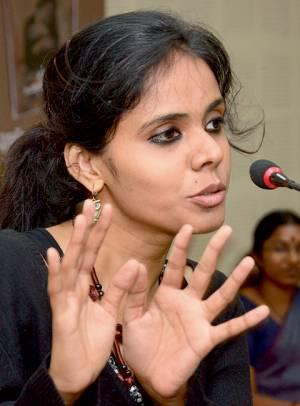
Meena in 2012

As a writer, Meena's focus was mainly on caste annihilation, feminism and linguistic identity. She says, "Poetry is not caught up within larger structures that pressure you to adopt a certain set of practices while you present your ideas in the way that academic language is," and thus, prefers to use it for her activism. One of her first collections, Touch, was published in August 2006, with a foreword by Kamala Das. Ms. Militancy was published the following year. In this book, the author adopts an anti-caste and feminist lens to retell Hindu and Tamil myths. The title poem of this volume is based on Kannaki, the heroine of the Tamil Classic Silapathikaram. Other works, such as "Mascara" and "My Lover Speaks of Rape", won her prizes in India poetry competitions.

Touch was criticised for its English language errors, though its challenging themes were described as "interesting". Ms. Militancy was described as an improvement in her use of the English language but "disastrous, if not worse" in terms of themes and content. A review in The Hindu put the negative criticism into context, describing Meena's work as difficult for anyone whose politics were "mainstream". Her poetry is "about the female self and body in ways not 'allowed' by this discourse". An analysis of Touch and Ms Militancy in the Journal of Postcolonial Cultures and Societies concludes that Meena "authors a poetic discourse that not only castigates the prevalent modes of subjugation but also resolutely strives towards futures that are yet to be born." In an interview with Sampsonia Way Magazine, Meena said: "My poetry is naked, my poetry is in tears, my poetry screams in anger, my poetry writhes in pain. My poetry smells of blood, my poetry salutes sacrifice. My poetry speaks like my people, my poetry speaks for my people."

Her work has been published in anthologies and journals that include Anthology of Contemporary Indian Poetry, The Little Magazine, Kavya Bharati, Indian Literature, Poetry International Web, Muse India, Quarterly Literary Review, Outlook, Tehelka and The New Indian Express. She was also invited to participate in the International Writing Program at the University of Iowa in 2009 Two years later, Meena was made the Charles Wallace India Trust Fellow at the University of Kent. She was a featured poet at the City of Asylum Jazz Poetry Concert held in Pittsburgh, the 14th Poetry Africa International Festival (2010), Durban, and the DSC Jaipur Literature Festival (2011).

She co-authored AYYANKALI: A Dalit leader of Organic Protest, a biography of Ayyankali, a dalit leader in Kerala. The foreword was written by Kancha Ilaiah). Meena was shortlisted among 21 short fiction women writers aged less than 40 from South Asia for an anthology published by Zubaan Books, New Delhi. In 2014, she published a novel about the Kilvenmani massacre titled The Gypsy Goddess, influenced by the figure of Kurathi Amman, her "ancestral goddess". From January 2013, she began working on a book titled Caste and the City of Nine Gates, her first non-fiction work. When I Hit You, her 2017 novel, was shortlisted for the Women's Prize in 2018.

She was elected a Fellow of the Royal Society of Literature in 2022.

=== As activist ===
Meena works closely with issues of caste and gender and how society puts people into stereotypical roles on the basis of these categories. She has faced threats for her fearless criticism of the Hindu society, to which she says: "This threat of violence shouldn't dictate what you are going to write or hinder you in any manner."

In 2012, a group of Dalit students of Osmania University, Hyderabad, organised a beef eating festival to protest against the "food fascism" in hostels. The right-wing student group Akhil Bharatiya Vidyarthi Parishad (ABVP) staged protests against the event and organisers. Meena attended the festival and spoke in support of it. She faced incessant abuse online as a result. The Network of Women in Media India (NWMI) released a press statement condemning the attack on her.

=== As translator ===
Meena has translated prose and poetry from Tamil. She has translated the work of Periyar E. V. Ramasamy, Thol. Thirumavalavan and Tamil Eelam writers such as Kasi Anandan, Cheran and VIS Jayapalan into English. Speaking about her role as translator, she says: "I know that there is no limit, no boundary, no specific style guide to poetry—that you are free to experiment, that you are free to find your own voice, that you are free to flounder and also free to fail once in a while because all this happens all the time when you translate." In 2023, she released Thirukkural: The Book of Desire, a feminist translation of Book III of the Tirukkural.

=== As actor ===
Meena made her acting debut in the 2014 Malayalam film Oraalppokkam. It was the first online crowdfunded independent Malayalam feature film.

== Awards ==
- Hermann Kesten Prize (2022) by PEN Centre Germany.

== Published works ==
=== Poetry ===
- Kandasamy, Meena (2005). The Eighth Day of Creation. Slow Trains.
- Kandasamy, Meena (2006). TOUCH. Mumbai: Peacock Books. ISBN 978-8188811878.
- Kandasamy, Meena (2015). #ThisPoemWillProvokeYou & Other Poems. India: HarperCollins.
- Kandasamy, Meena (2018). We Are Not The Citizens. London: Tangerine Press.
- Kandasamy, Meena (2019). Ms. Militancy. New Delhi: Navayana. ISBN 978-8189059903.
- Kandasamy, Meena (2023). Tomorrow Someone Will Arrest You. London: Atlantic Books. ISBN 978-1838959029.

=== Novels ===
- Kandasamy, Meena (2014). The Gypsy Goddess. London: Atlantic Books. ISBN 978-1782391784.
- Kandasamy, Meena (2017). When I Hit You: Or, A Portrait of the Writer as a Young Wife. London: Atlantic Books. ISBN 978-9386228840.
- Kandasamy, Meena (2019). Exquisite Cadavers. London: Atlantic Books. ISBN 978-1786499653.
- Kandasamy, Meena (2026). Fieldwork as a Sex Object. India: HarperCollins. ISBN 9781846016592.

=== Non-Fiction ===
- Kandasamy, Meena; Nisar, M. (2007). Ayyankali: A Dalit leader of Organic Protest. Calicut: Sahithi Books. ISBN 978-81-90388764.
- Kandasamy, Meena (2021). The Orders Were To Rape You : Tigresses in the Tamil Eelam Struggle. New Delhi: Navayana. ISBN 978-8194865445.
- Kandasamy, Meena (2025). A Wise One, a Warrior. Objects Talk Back. Chicago: University of Chicago Press. ISBN 978-3035807547.

=== Translations ===
- Thirumavalavan, Tholkappiyan (2003). Talisman: Extreme Emotions of Dalit Liberation. Translated by Kandasamy, Meena. Kolkata: Samya Books. ISBN 978-8185604688.
- Thirumavalavan, Tholkappiyan (2004). Uproot Hindutva: The Fiery Voice of the Liberation Panthers. Translated by Kandasamy, Meena. Kolkata: Samya Books. ISBN 978-8185604794.
- Ramasamy, Periyar E.V. (2007). Why Were Women Enslaved?. Translated by Kandasamy, Meena. Chennai: The Periyar Self-Respect Propaganda Institution. ISBN 978-9395268325.
- Ravikumar, D. (2010). Waking is Another Dream: Poems on the Genocide in Tamil Eelam. Translated by Kandasamy, Meena; Ravishannker. New Delhi: Navayana. ISBN 978-8189059378.
- Maithri, Malathi; Salma, Rajathi; Revathi, Kutti; Sukirtharani (2018). Desires Become Demons: Poems of Four Tamil Women Poets. Translated by Kandasamy, Meena. Sheffield: Tilted Axis Press. ISBN 978-1911284260.
- Thiruvalluvar (2023). Thirukkural: The Book of Desire. Translated by Kandasamy, Meena. New Delhi: Penguin Random House. ISBN 978-0670097081.

== See also ==
- Dalit literature
