= When I Hit You: Or, A Portrait of the Writer as a Young Wife =

2020 novel by Meena Kandasamy

When I Hit You: Or, A Portrait of a Writer as a Young Wife
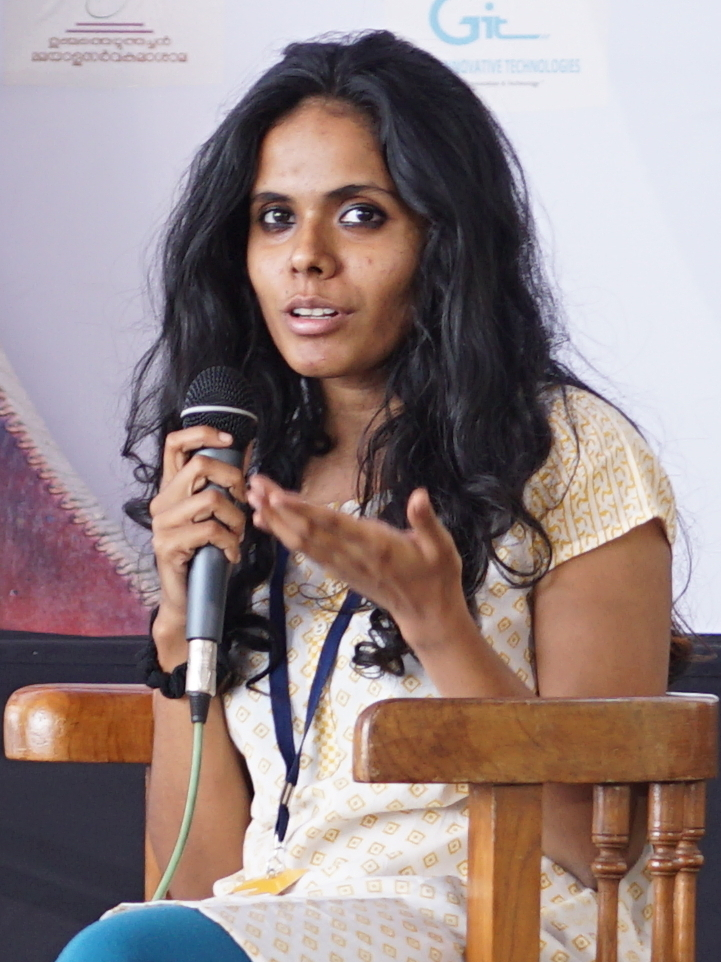
- Author: Meena Kandasamy
- Language: English
- Genre: Autofiction
- Publisher: Atlantic Books
- Publication date: May 4th, 2017
- Pages: 249
- ISBN: 9781786491268

When I Hit You: Or, a Portrait of a Writer as a Young Wife is a 2020 novel by Meena Kandasamy that is set in modern-day India. It explores domestic violence and survival through a feminist lens, showcasing how the patriarchy silences women.

When I Hit You follows an unnamed narrator retelling the story of her four-month marriage and how she was able to survive it. The narrator is an academic and a writer, who marries a communist college professor studying Marxism. The novel follows her becoming increasingly isolated from her friends, family, and working life while finding her own methods of coping as her husband bullies her into becoming his idea of an obedient wife. The marriage that she originally fell into as a respite from heartbreak turns deeply abusive, with this story covering some of the darkest moments with her ex-husband.

After its debut, it was shortlisted for the Women's Prize for Fiction and the Jhalak Prize, along with being longlisted for the Dylan Thomas Prize.

== Plot summary ==
The story opens to the narrator in her home, Primrose Villa, in the town of Mangalore, which is where her and her husband moved after their marriage. The relocation is because of the husband’s new job as a professor for a local college, where our narrator hopes to work as well once the new semester starts. This move to a costal town is the first step in isolating the narrator from those she loves.

The husband continues to take the isolation further, first by forcing the narrator to deactivate her Facebook, then by convincing her to share her email password with him by showing how he signs his emails with both of their names. Later, she learns he has been answering her emails for her, and she feels as though she is losing her identity as a writer and a person. This only worsens when she learns she will not be able to teach at school. Her husband does allow her to lecture in his course, but the students exchange notes about her messy hair and appearance. She shares this with her husband, but he blames her.

The deactivation of her Facebook account has taken a serious toll on her career as a writer because that was her main form of networking. He continues to take the isolation further, restricting her internet use to three hours a day under his supervision. He justifies his abuse with Marxist and anti-capitalist rhetoric. When he is away from home, she writes letters to imagined lovers, deleting them before he can see. This helps her cope and creates a sense of control.

Through flashbacks, we learn of the narrator’s previous relationship with a politician. The politician made her keep the relationship a secret because he thought being a bachelor made him more trustworthy to the voters. She was deeply in love with him, although he was significantly older, but there were many rumors of him sleeping with other woman. Despite this, the relationship continues until he ends up in the hospital because of an emergency. Not only is she the last to know, but when she arrives, he refuses to even acknowledge her. This breaks her heart, and she realizes that she deserves better from a relationship.

Her husband takes it upon himself to delete all the narrator’s emails, causing her to lose her writing contacts, drafts, and important messages. His abuse escalates; he calls her derogatory terms and begins physically abusing her. He beats her with objects like her MacBook cord and his belt. He hits her and kicks her. Whenever she tries to bring up the abuse to her parents, they tell her to keep her head down and stick it out. She tries to take their advice, but it only gets worse. He uses her sexual past to humiliate her and brutally rapes her, forcing her to take no pleasure from sex, using it as a corrective measure and to try to disable her.

After four months, he feels that it is time for her to have his baby. The last thing she wants is to bring a child into a home she feels so unsafe in. He begins to threaten to kill her. This and the thought of a child is her breaking point. She calls her parents and tells them all the horrible truths of her marriage, including the threats of murder. They tell her if he threatens her life again, she must leave and come to them. She instigates a fight while emasculating him, causing him to smash her face into the ground while beating her. Afterward, she finds an opportunity to escape and runs to her parents.

She seeks legal repercussions for her ex-husband but finds it is more difficult than imagined. He is asked to resign but finds a new job quickly and eventually becomes an activist and gets a new girlfriend. The narrator fears becoming controlled by another man, although she does want true love. Eventually, she leaves town to find a new path. She will always write as it gives her an escape and a home.

== Principal characters ==
The Wife: She is the unnamed narrator of the story who is a young, educated, aspiring writer. After she is heartbroken from a two-year affair with a politician, she meets and marries a man who isolates and abuses her.

The Husband: A university lecturer and Marxist scholar, he is married to the narrator and becomes increasingly abusive and manipulative as the novel continues.

The Wife’s Parents: Middle-class Tamil couple who encourage their daughter to make the marriage to her husband work, until the end of the novel where they become her escape.

== Major themes and motifs ==
=== Writing as an act of healing ===
After leaving the abusive marriage, the narrator writes about her marriage in a magazine, using the act of writing to help her heal. Leaving everything on the page allows her to share her trauma while also coming to new realizations. The novel shows how the narrator can channel the hurt they felt from the marriage into their art, like the love letters written to imaginary lovers.

=== Domestic violence ===
Domestic violence is a prevalent issue all over the world, but in India a significant amount of women have experienced it due to the patriarchal system and cultural norms. The Protection of Women from Domestic Violence Act of 2005 was put in place to protect women from all types of abuse because it was estimated “that 40% of women experience abuse at the hands of a partner.” But it doesn’t protect against everything. If you are over the age of fifteen, nonconsensual sexual intercourse between you and your husband is not defined as rape.

The narrator of When I Hit You endures the violence of her husband, a Marxist scholar, in their four month marriage. It starts with her being isolated from her support system after moving cities for his job, and continues to escalate. He verbally, physically, and emotionally abuses her, taking away every aspect of her freedom. Kandasamy also deals with the question asked of many domestic violence victims; why didn’t they leave? She paints it as not only a story of abuse, but also one of figuring out how to get out of the intense isolation she is in.

=== Patriarchal social structures ===
Indian society typically views marriage as the goal for all woman, putting them in the housewife position to bear children and care for their husband. The narrator in When I Hit You is forced to stay silent and perform these duties while being abused and violated by her husband. Kandasamy highlights the gender bias of society through her novel, showing the toll it takes on the wives stuck in these marriages and how common it is. When the narrator converses with her parents about her abuse, they tell her to stay quiet and make the marriage work, a great example of how much blame is put on the wife about marital problems.

== Background ==
Meena Kandasamy wrote this book because of her own personal experience with marital violence during the writing of her debut novel, The Gypsy Goddess. After finishing that book, she felt the need to write about something that she had directly been a part of. Although the book is not a direct copy of what happened in her own experience, it is her memories of the situation she was in. She leaves the narrator unnamed and mostly undescribed so that any woman can imagine themselves in that story.
