= Bhanwar Meghwanshi =

Indian social activist

- Born: 1975 (age 50–51); Rajasthan, India
- Occupation: Social activist
- Known for: Dalit rights
- Notable work: I Could Not Be Hindu: The Story of a Dalit in the RSS

Bhanwar Meghwanshi (born c. 1975) is an Indian author, social activist, and journalist from Rajasthan. He is best known for his memoir I Could Not Be Hindu: The Story of a Dalit in the RSS, which recounts his journey from being a member of the Rashtriya Swayamsevak Sangh (RSS) to becoming a prominent Dalit activist after experiencing caste-based discrimination. His work has contributed to discussions on caste dynamics and social justice in India.

== Early life ==
Bhanwar Meghwanshi was born in 1975 into a Dalit, Kabir-panthi family in Rajasthan, a sect known for its rejection of caste hierarchies. Growing up in a region characterised by feudal traditions and a history of bonded labour for Dalits, his early life likely influenced his later activism.

== Involvement & departure with the RSS ==
At the age of 13 in 1987, Meghwanshi joined the RSS, drawn by its nationalist ideology. He became actively involved in the Ram Janmabhoomi movement and participated in the 1990 karseva, though he was arrested before reaching Ayodhya. His time in the RSS was marked by growing disillusionment due to caste-based discrimination. A pivotal moment occurred in 1991 in Bhilwara, when RSS members refused to eat food prepared by his family because of their Dalit identity. This incident led him to question the organisation's claims of inclusivity, prompting his departure from the RSS later that year.

== Post-RSS activism and journalism ==
Following his exit from the RSS, Meghwanshi embraced the Dalit movement, drawing inspiration from Dr. B.R. Ambedkar. He emerged as a vocal advocate for social justice, working as a journalist and activist. His activism addresses issues such as casteism and witch-hunting in tribal areas of Rajasthan.

== Books ==
- Meghwanshi, Bhanwar (2022). I Could Not Be Hindu:: The Story of a Dalit in the RSS. HarperCollins India. ISBN 978-81-948654-9-0.
