= S. Anand =

Indian author, publisher and journalist

- Born: India
- Occupations: Journalist; writer; publisher
- Notable work: Founder of Navayana; Editor of annotated editions of Annihilation of Caste; Bhimayana

S. Anand is an Indian author, publisher and journalist. He, along with D. Ravikumar, founded the publishing house Navayana in 2003, which is "India's first and only publishing house to focus on the issue of caste from an anticaste perspective."

== Career ==
Navayana won the British Council–London Book Fair International Young Publisher of the Year award in 2007. In Pali, the word navayana means 'new vehicle'. B. R. Ambedkar used the word in 1956 to describe the branch of Buddhism that would not be mired in the Hinayana–Mahayana divide, but would help dalits gain equality in India.

S. Anand is an Ambedkarite and a Buddhist. S. Anand co-authored, with Srividya Natarajan, and illustrators Durgabai Vyam and Suresh Vyam, the hugely popular graphic novel Bhimayana: Experiences of Untouchability on the life of B. R. Ambedkar, Indian polymath, social reformer and the architect of the Indian Constitution. He has also annotated Ambedkar's classic Annihilation of Caste; the annotated edition has an introductory essay by Arundhati Roy titled "The Doctor and the Saint". He co-authored Finding My Way with the Pradhan Gond artist Venkat Raman Singh Shyam. He is a student of Dhrupad with Ustad F. Wasifuddin Dagar.

Before starting Navayana, Anand was a journalist with the news magazines Outlook and Tehelka. He is married to R. Sivapriya who works with Bloomsbury India.
