= Japani Shyam =

Indian Gond artist (born 1988)

- Born: 1988 (age 37–38); Bhopal, Madhya Pradesh, India
- Parents: Jangarh Singh Shyam (father); Nankusia Shyam (mother)
- Awards: FICCI; 2018 Young Achiever’s Award – visual artist

Japani Shyam (born 1988) is one of 14 Indian Gond artist who took forward the Gond tribal art form.

== Early life ==
Shyam was born in Bhopal, Madhya Pradesh. She is the daughter of Nankusia Shyam and pioneering contemporary Indian Gond artist Jangarh Singh Shyam. Her mother Nansukia is one of the prominent Gond artists. When her father first time had been to Japan she had born. So they named her Japani. She was 13 years old when her father committed suicide. After this incident, she, sibling Mayank and their mother had taken forward Jangarh's new style in traditional Gond art- named Jangarh Kalam.

== Career ==
Shyam began painting with her father Jangarh Singh Shyam when she was 7 years old. She used to assist her father in his exhibition. Her father submitted her work for competition when she was 11 years old. Subsequently, she won the Kamala Devi Award. She had her exhibition in the cities of Delhi, Mumbai, Chennai and Bangalore.

== Style & themes ==
Shyam's painting usually based on nature, animal and birds. She is keen to paint simple form with a comparatively light colour, unlike other prominent Gond artists. Shyam draws animals from her imagination that might not resemble the real ones. She had developed her own white on the black style of painting after some experimentation with new ideas. Trees play a major role in her painting.

== Exhibitions ==
Shyam had her International exhibition in New York and Tokyo, with other international exhibition in the countries like Korea and France.

=== Solo ===
Shyam did her first solo exhibition at Gallerie Ganesha in New Delhi in 2019

=== Group ===
She did her group exhibition with Bhajju Shyam, Mayank Shyam and Ram Singh Urvetti at Bhopal 2011. Her next group exhibition with Korean calligrapher Song Dong OCK in Chennai in 2018.

== Awards ==
- Kamla Devi Award at the Crafts Museum in Delhi 1999
- FICCI Young Achiever's Award 2018

== See also ==
- Jangarh Singh Shyam
