= Lalit Surjan =

Indian journalist (1946–2020)

Lalit Surjan (1946 – December 2, 2020) was a journalist and editor based out of Raipur, Chhattisgarh, India. He was the Editor in Chief of Deshbandhu.

== Biography ==
Surjan was the son of journalist Mayaram Surjan. Mayaram Surjan had started Deshbandhu in 1959. He started the Mayaram Surjan Foundation, and the Jan Darshan Media Centre, which was the first video documentation unit in Chhattisgarh.

He was associated with the All India Peace and Solidarity Organisation (AIPSO) and the Progressive Writers Association. Surjan was associated with the local chapter of the Indian National Trust for Art and Cultural Heritage (INTACH).

== Books ==
Surjan authored two books: one about the decline of the media in India Tum Kahan ho Joney Vaker and another volume of essays called Sharanarthi Shivir main Vivah Geet.

== Personal life ==
Surjan was married and has three daughters.

He was suffering from lung cancer. Surjan died from a brain stroke in New Delhi on December 2, 2020. He was 74.
