= Bharat Bhavan =

Autonomous multi-arts complex and museum in Bhopal, India

Coordinates: 23.2470°N 77.3923°E

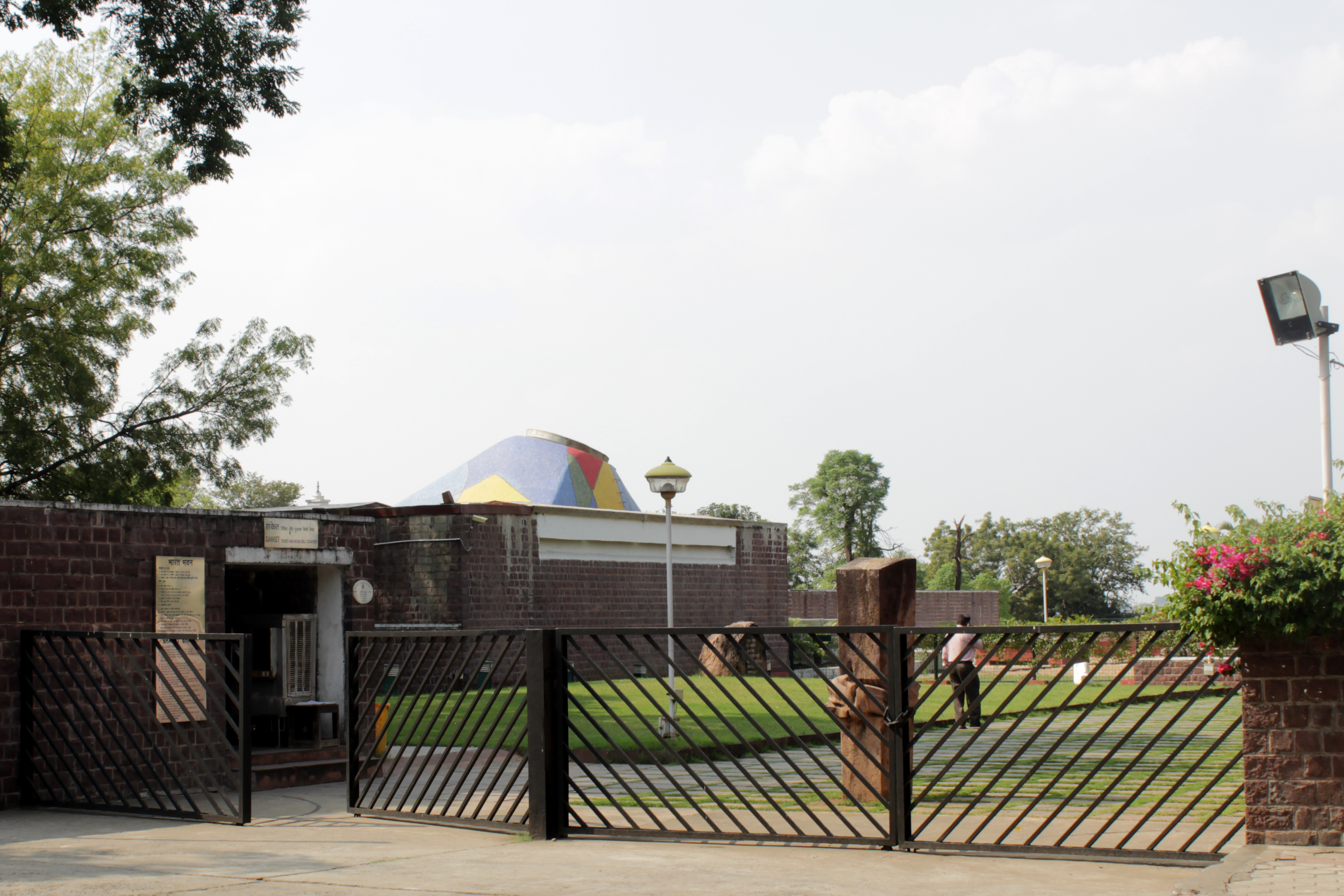
- Bharat Bhavan entry gate in 2015
- Formation: 13 February 1982
- Legal status: Foundation
- Purpose: Visual arts, performing arts, folk art, literature
- Location: J. Swaminathan Marg, Shamla Hills, near Upper Lake, Bhopal
- Main organ: Bharat Bhavan Trust
- Website: bharatbhawan.org

Bharat Bhavan is an autonomous multi-arts complex and museum in Bhopal, India, established and funded by the Government of Madhya Pradesh. The architect of the Bharat Bhavan is Charles Correa. Opened in 1982, facing the Upper Lake, Bhopal, it houses multiple art galleries, a graphic printing workshop, a ceramics workshop, an open-air amphitheatre, a studio theatre, an auditorium, a museum of tribal & folk art, and libraries of Indian poetry, classical music & folk music.

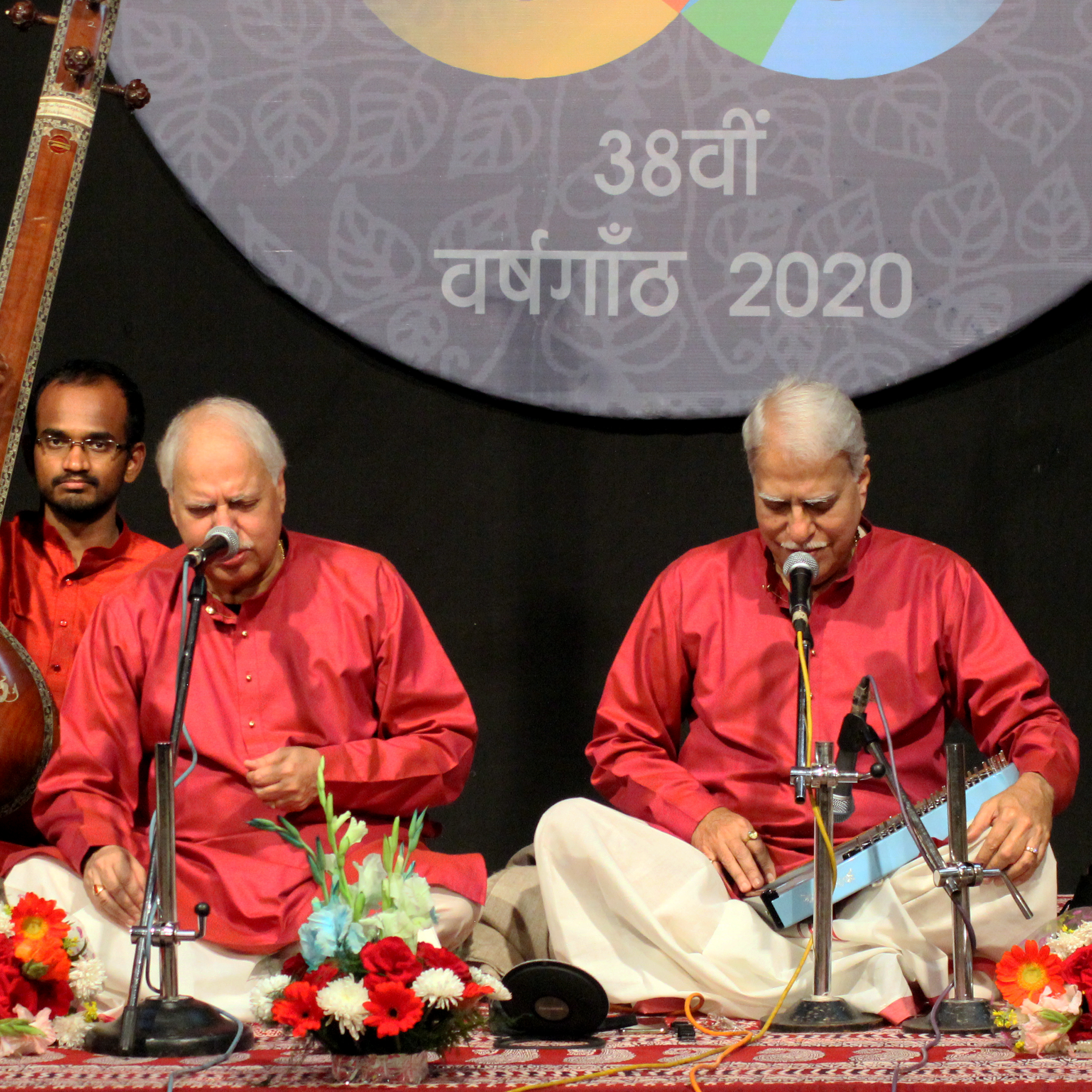
Pandit Rajan Sajan Mishra Performing on its 38th foundation day - 13 February 2020

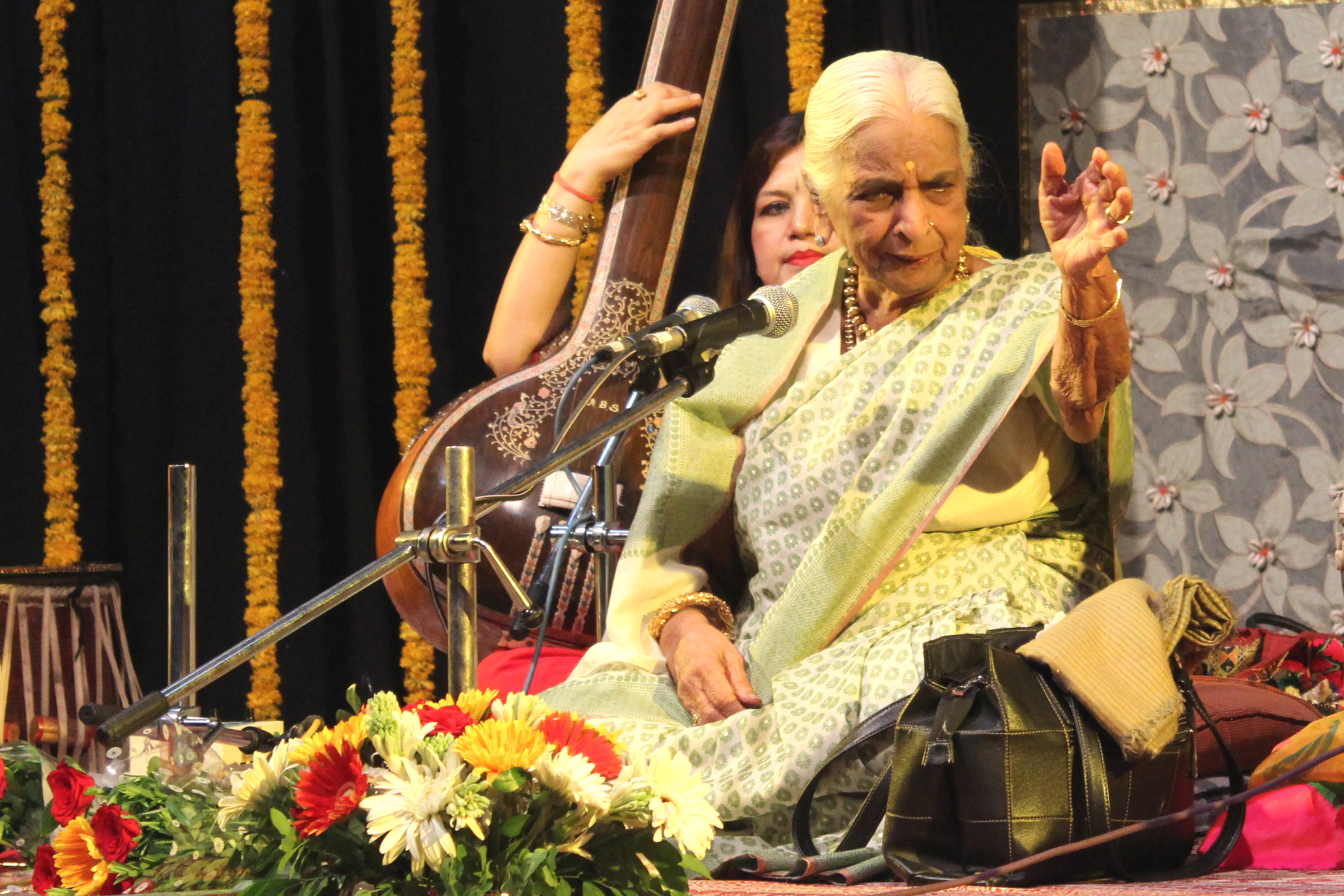
Girija Devi performing at Uttar Pradesh Mahotsav - July 2015

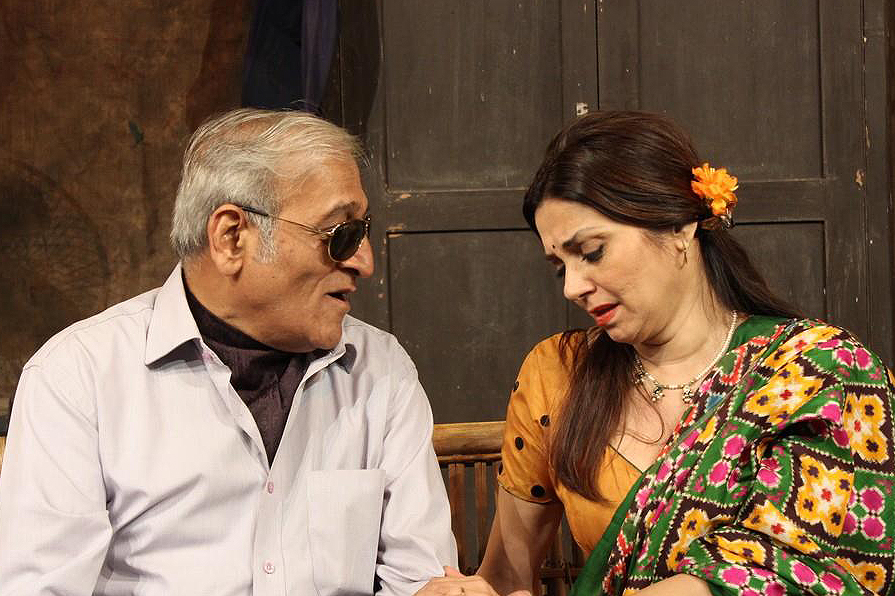
Mohan Agashe and Lillete Dubey performing in a play Aadhe Adhoore written by Mohan Rakesh

== History ==
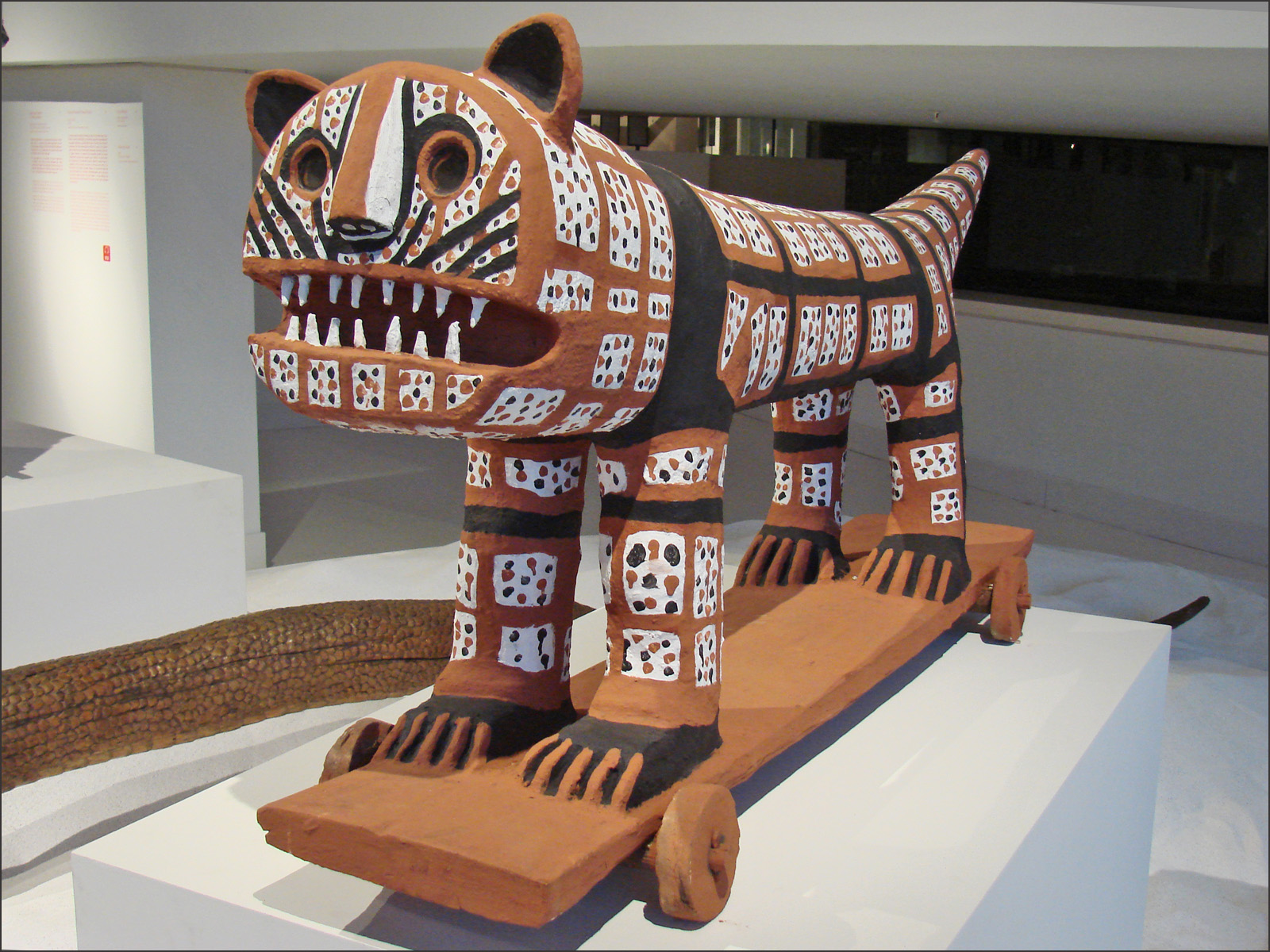
A tribal art tiger sculpture from Bastar, Bharat Bhavan collection

The early 1980s saw a burgeoning of the Indian arts scene and a renewed government focus on developing arts across the nation, through regional centers for arts in state capitals. The initiative, in Madhya Pradesh, was furthered to fruition by cultural administrator, Ashok Vajpeyi, an IAS-officer in the state Ministry of Education (1966-1992), who was also behind the setting up of the literary organization, 'Kalidas Academy', in Ujjain in 1983. Though some cultural initiatives lost steam in later years in many parts of India, one project that became a success is the Bharat Bhavan (India House) in Bhopal.

The institution was inaugurated on 13 February 1982 by then Prime Minister, Indira Gandhi. It was established and funded by the Department of Culture, Government of Madhya Pradesh, though it is run by an autonomous 12-member Bharat Bhavan Trust. In the following decade, the institution grew to become an important cultural institution of India as it started attracting artists, scholars, students and other visitors from Indore, Jabalpur, Mumbai, Kolkata and even foreign countries.

During its formative years, theatre personality, B. V. Karanth who headed the 'Rangamandal repertory', incorporated folk forms of the region into his work, staged many productions in Hindi, especially during his stint at the Bharat Bhavan. The "Bharat Bhavan Biennial of Contemporary Indian Art" started in 1986, followed by "Bharat Bhavan International Print Biennial" in 1989. The complex is most known for its art museum, Roopankar, which houses a permanent collection of tribal art, collected by Jagdish Swaminathan in its early years, and represents the best examples of tribal art in India.

The 'Vagarth' centre of Hindi poetry and literature houses a library and archive of Indian poetry, classical music and folk music. It organizes the 'Katha Prasang' festival on Hindi literature.

== Overview ==
The complex includes an art gallery of Indian painting and sculpture, a fine art workshop, an open-air amphitheatre ("Bahirang"), a studio theatre ("Abhirang"), an auditorium ("Antarang"), a museum of tribal & folk art and libraries of Indian poetry, classical music & folk music. Besides this, the Bhavan hosts artists and writers under its artist-in-residence program at the "Ashram". Over the years, it has also become a popular tourist attraction.

Some of the wings include:

- Roopankar - Museum of Fine Art: Gallery of contemporary, folk & tribal art and a modern art gallery, a Graphic Art workshop and a Ceramics Art workshop
- Rangmandal - theatre repertory
- Vagarth - center of Indian poetry, library, archive and translation center
- Anhad - library of classical and folk music, audio and video archives, it organizes dance recitals and classical music series like, Parampara and Saptak
- Chhavi - center of classical cinema
- Nirala Srijanpeeth - the chair for creative writing, founded by the Government of Madhya Pradesh

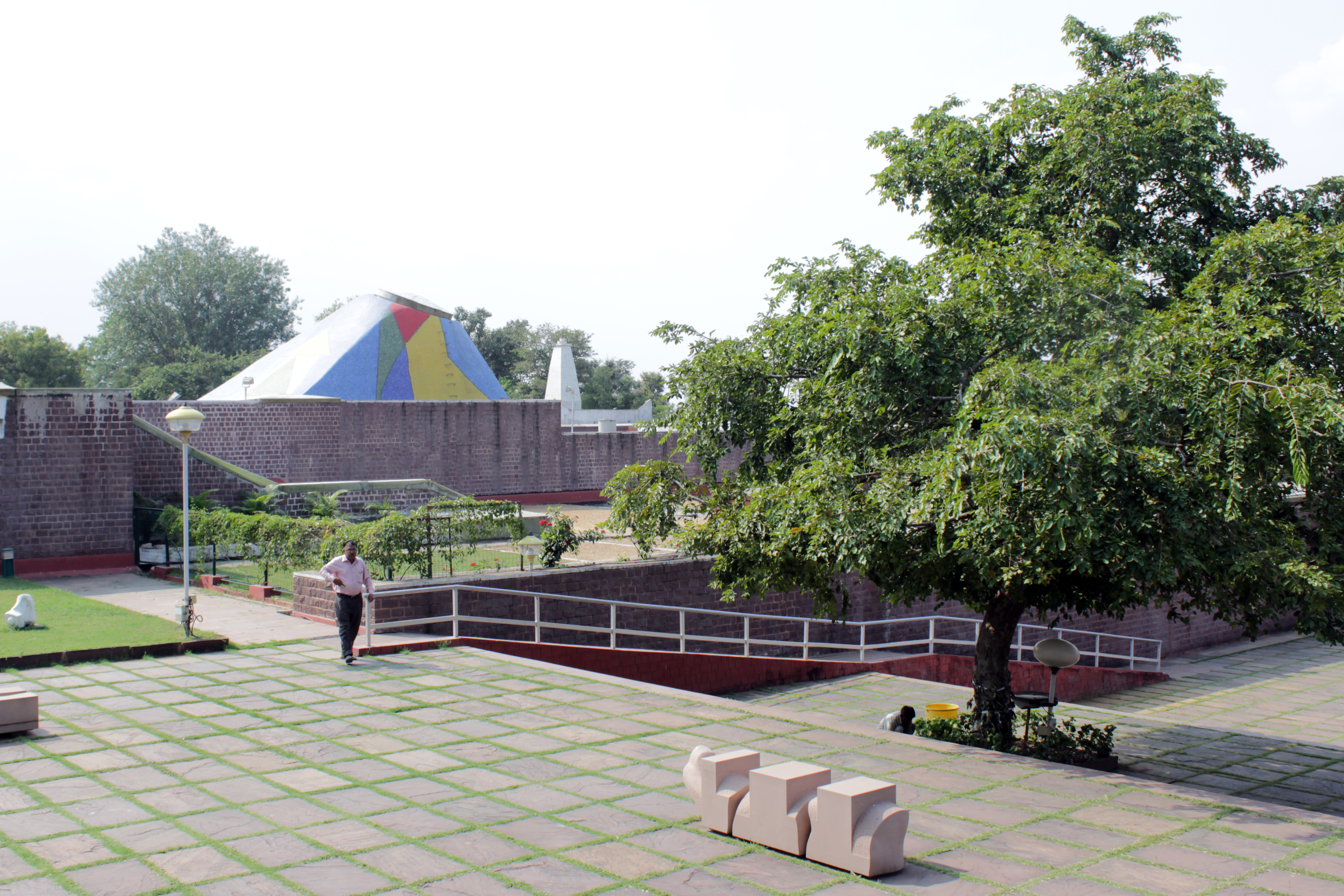
Bharat Bhavan Bhopal Inside

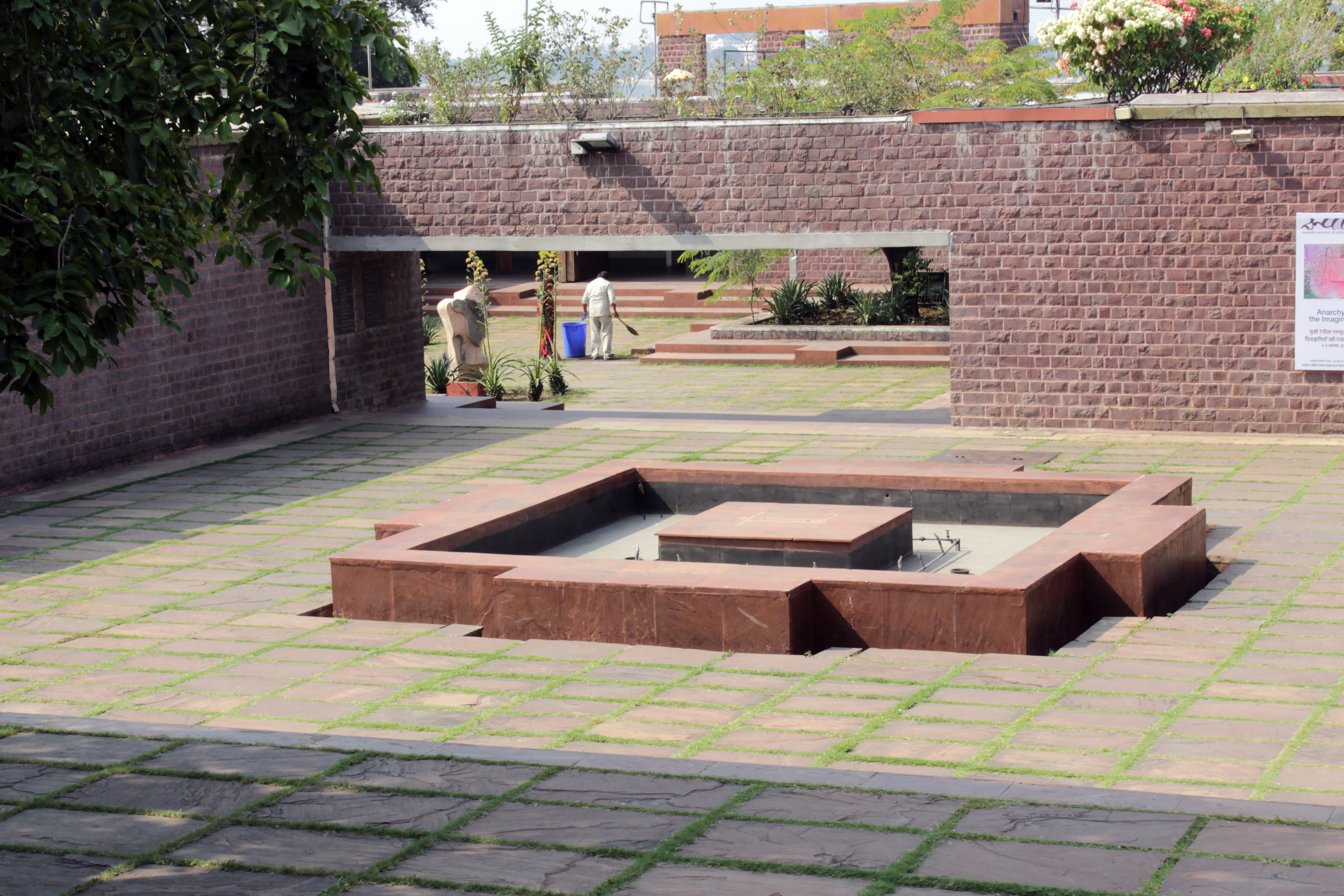
Bharat Bhavan Bhopal Inside

== Bibliography ==
- Don Rubin (1998). The World Encyclopedia of Contemporary Theatre: Asia. Taylor & Francis. ISBN 978-0-415-05933-6.
- S. H. Raza; Ashok Vajpeyi (2005). Passion: Life and Art of Raza. Rajkamal Prakashan. ISBN 8126710403.
- David Abram (2003). The Rough Guide to India. Rough Guides. ISBN 1843530899.
- Rashmi Sadana (2012). English Heart, Hindi Heartland. University of California Press. ISBN 978-0520269576.
- Lalit Surjan; Vinod Verma (1996). Reference Madhya Pradesh. Deshbandhu Publication Division.
- Peter Herrle; Stephanus Schmitz (2009). "Architecture and Contemporary Indian Identity". Constructing Identity in Contemporary Architecture. LIT Verlag Münster. ISBN 978-3643102768.
