= Navayana (publishing house) =

Independent Indian anti-caste publishing house

- Founded: 2003
- Founder: S. Anand
- Country of origin: India
- Official website: navayana.org

Navayana is an independent anti-caste Indian publishing house based in New Delhi, strongly influenced by Ambedkarite ideas. It was founded by S. Anand and D. Ravikumar in 2003. The first book it published was Ambedkar: Autobiographical Notes priced at Rs 40 (about $1 at that time). Since then it has published acclaimed fiction, non-fiction, graphic novels and poetry anthologies. From 2009 onwards, Navayana broadened its publishing outlook to include social issues other than caste because ‘the struggle against caste cannot happen in isolation from other struggles for justice and equality’ as a statement on the website reads.

In Pali, the word "navayana" means "new vehicle". B. R. Ambedkar used the word in 1956 to describe the branch of Buddhism that wouldn't be mired in the Hinayana-Mahayana divide, but would help dalits gain equality in India.

== The Navayana logo ==
The logo of the publishing house is an ink sketch of two buffaloes kissing. The publisher S. Anand explains that the iconography comes from an excerpt from Aravind Malagatti’s autobiography in Kannada, Government Brahmana. It is a story about how the ideology of caste does not allow a dalit-owned she-buffalo in heat to mate with a he-buffalo owned by a landlord. For the cover art of the April 2003 issue of The Dalit, a journal run by the Dalit Media Network, Chennai, Anand approached the artist Chandru (G. Chandrasekaran) with this story. The logo is a close-up of the artist’s interpretation.

== Founders ==
=== S. Anand ===
Anand has worked as a journalist with Deccan Chronicle, Indian Express, The Hindu and Outlook. At the time of the launch of Navayana, he was working for Outlook in Chennai. In 2007, he left his day job as a journalist and turned full-time to publishing. Today, he is the publisher of Navayana Publishing Pvt Ltd based in New Delhi.

=== D. Ravikumar ===
Ravikumar is an activist in the civil rights movement in Tamil Nadu. At the time of the launch of Navayana, he was a bank employee. In 2006, he turned full-time to politics and became a member of the Viduthalai Chiruthaigal Katchi, and was elected to the Tamil Nadu Legislative Assembly.

== Annual lectures ==
Navayana hosted its first annual lecture where the Slovenian Marxist philosopher, Slavoj Žižek, spoke in New Delhi, Kochi and Hyderabad to packed audiences.

=== 2011 ===
The American feminist thinker and former Black Panther, Angela Yvonne Davis, delivered lectures in New Delhi and Pune.

=== 2015 ===
The aboriginal writer from Australia, Ali Cobby Eckermann, delivered the lectures in New Delhi and in Kolkata.

== Controversies ==
After the release of "The Doctor and The Saint" by Navayana, several anti-caste activists rejected her introduction to the book. They argued that Arundhati Roy had misrepresented Ambedkar's views on eugenics, tribal issues, capitalism, among other issues, for marketing purposes. At the time, Dalit Camera released interviews on their YouTube channel and an open letter to Arundhati Roy, clarifying rumours that threats from Dalit activists had been the reason for the stalling of a book launch in Hyderabad. In the letter, they make it clear that activists had only been prepared with several questions for Roy, and also attach the list of questions for her. Both the letter by Dalit Camera and Roy's response have been published in Hatred in the Belly.

In 2014, Ambedkar Age Collective (published by The Shared Mirror publishing house) released the book Hatred In The Belly critiquing the introduction to "The Doctor and the Saint" by Arundhati Roy. The title of the book is from a Telugu phrase that the poet Joopaku Subhadra uses in his essay, "Ka dapulo kasi". In this collection of essays & speeches by various Dalit activists and scholars, the authors write a scathing critique of how the introduction does not do justice to the seminal book that is Annihilation of Caste. Ambedkar Age Collective writes about the book that it will "unfurl before you a critical tapestry dissecting the hegemonic brahminic discourse which works towards delegitimizing the radical legacy of Ambedkarite thought". The larger criticism against the book and Navayana was that they did not consult experts of anti-caste narratives in writing the introduction to Annihilation of Caste, and questioned Roy's claim to expertise on the matter. The various authors included in the book are: Bojja Tharakam, Adv. Dr. Suresh Mane, Anoop Kumar, U. Sambashiva Rao, Sunny Kapicadu, K. K. Baburaj, Joopaka Subhadra, Dr. K. Satyanarayana, Anu Ramdas, Kuffir, Gurinder Azad, Shakyamuni, Dr. Sangeeta Pawar, Dr. O. K. Santhosh, Dr. B. Ravichandran, Dalit Camera: Through Un-Touchable Eyes, Karthik Navayan, Vaibhav Wasnik, Nilesh Kumar, Asha Kowtal, Nidhin Shobhana, Gee Imaan Semmalar, Syam Sundar, Murali Shanmugavelan, Praveena Thaali, Dr Karthick RM, Huma Dar, Joby Mathew, James Michael, Akshay Pathak, Vinay Bhat, Yogesh Maitreya, Thongam Bipin, Sruthi Herbert, Gaurav Somwanshi, Kadhiravan, Rahul Gaikwad, Joe D'Cruz.

== Awards ==
The founder of Navayana, S. Anand, won the International Young Publishing Entrepreneur Award in 2007.
