= List of autobiographies by Indians =

List of autobiographies written by Indians

Author	Title of book	Year	Remarks
Banarasidas	Ardhakathānaka	1641	Braj Bhasha
Rassundari Devi	Aamar Jiban	1876	Bengali
Bhagat Singh	Why I Am An Atheist	1931	
Narmad	Mari Hakikat	1933	Gujarati
B. R. Ambedkar	Waiting for a Visa	1935	The book is used as a textbook in Columbia University.
Jawaharlal Nehru	An Autobiography	1936	
Mohandas Karamchand Gandhi	The Story of My Experiments with Truth	1940s	
Paramahansa Yogananda	Autobiography of a Yogi	1946	
Rajendra Prasad, first president	Atmakahktha	1946	ENGLISH
U. V. Swaminatha Iyer	En Sarithiram	1950	Tamil
Nirad C. Chaudhuri	The Autobiography of an Unknown Indian	1951	
Annabhau Sathe	Fakira	1959	part myth, part autobiography
Baburao Bagul	When I concealed my caste - (जेव्हा मी जात चोरली होती!)	1963	
Prakash Tandon	Punjabi Century 1857-1947	1963	
Vinayak Damodar Savarkar	Shatruchya Shibiraat	1965	Originally written in Marathi, and later translated to English. Translated version in English is titled "Inside the Enemy Camp".
Ravi Shankar	My Music, My Life	1968	
Kamala Surayya	Ente Katha	1973	English version My Story
Anna Chandy, first female judge	Atmakatha	1973	Malayalam
Sunil Gavaskar	Sunny Days: Sunil Gavaskar's Own Story	1976	
Amrita Pritam	The Revenue Stamp	1977	
Swami Rama	Living with the Himalayan Masters	1978	
Dagdu Maruti Pawar	Baluta	1978	
Namdeo Dhasal	Golpitha	1978	
Manilal Dwivedi	Atmavrittanta	1979	Published posthumously by Dhirubhai Thaker
Laxman Mane	Upara	1980	
Shankarrao Kharat	Taral Antaral	1981	
Sita Ram Goel	How I Became a Hindu	1982	
Satyajit Ray, director	Jakhan Choto Chilam	1982	
Shantabai Kamble	Majya Jalmachi Chittarkatha	1983	First autobiography of Dalit woman.
Shantabai Kamble	Mazhya Jalmachi Chittarkatha (The Kaleidoscopic Story Of My Life)	1983	
Babytai Kamble	Jinne Amuche ('Our Lives')	1986	
Narendra Jadhav	Aamcha Baap Ani Amhi (Our Father And We)	1993	
A. P. J. Abdul Kalam	Wings of Fire	1999	
Raja Dhale	Dalit Pantherchi Sansthapana: Vastustithi Ani Viparyas	2002	
Urmila Pawar	Aaydan (The Weave of My Life: A Dalit Woman's Memoirs)	2003	
Khushwant Singh	Truth, Love & a Little Malice	2002	
J. B. Kripalani	My Times: An Autobiography	2004	
Aribam Syam Sharma	Living Shadows	2006	
Phoolan Devi	The Bandit Queen of India	2006	
Nalini Jameela	The Autobiography Of A Sex Worker	2007	
L. K. Advani	My Country My Life	2008	
V. R. Krishna Iyer	Wandering in Many Worlds	2009	
Abhinav Bindra	A Shot at History	2011	
I K Gujral	Matters of Discretion	2011	
Arjun Singh	A Grain of Sand in the Hourglass of Time	2012	Hay House
Verghese Kurien	The Man Who Made The Elephant Dance	2012	Audioautobiography - Om Audio Books
Mary Kom	Unbreakable	2013	
Milkha Singh	The Race of My Life	2013	
Kapil Dev	Straight from the Heart	2013	
Prabha Khaitan	A Life Apart	2013	
Vijay Kumar Singh	Courage and Conviction	2013	
Yuvraj Singh	The Test of My Life	2013	
M. Karunanidhi	Nenjukku Needhi	2013	6 Volumes. 3926 Pages. Covering period from 1924 to 2006
K. Natwar Singh	One Life Is Not Enough	2014	
Sachin Tendulkar	Playing It My Way	2014	
Temsula Ao	Once Upon a Life: Burnt Curry and Bloody Rags: A Memoir	2014	
Sharad Pawar	On my Terms: From the Grassroots to the Corridors of Power	2015	
Sania Mirza	Ace Against Odds	2016	
Anil K. Rajvanshi	A Life of an ordinary Indian - An exercise in self-importance	2016	
Sonu Sood	I Am No Messiah	2020	
Ranjan Gogoi	Justice for the Judge	2021	
Arundhati Roy	Mother Mary Comes To Me	2025	
Vir Das	The Outsider: A Memoir for Misfits	2025	
