= Kamble =

Kamble is a Marathi-language Indian surname primarily found in the state of Maharashtra. The surname has a long social and occupational history and is shared by individuals belonging to a wide range of castes, religious groups, and communities, including Hindu, Buddhist (Neo-Buddhist), and Jain traditions. Its widespread usage reflects both occupational origins and later socio-religious transformations in Maharashtra's history.

== Etymology and origin ==
The surname Kamble is generally believed to derive from the Marathi word kamble, meaning cotton blanket or woollen covering. Historically, such blankets were commonly produced, traded, or used by communities involved in cotton cultivation, spinning, weaving, tailoring, and related rural or artisanal occupations. As was common in pre-modern India, occupational identifiers gradually became hereditary surnames.

One proposed regional origin of the surname is Vidarbha, where cotton farming and textile-related activities were historically prominent. Over time, individuals associated with such occupations adopted Kamble as a family name, regardless of caste affiliation.

Another possible origin is the Sonkamble clan name. In some Maharashtrian naming traditions, clan names (kuls or vamsh-names) later evolved into surnames. This suggests that Kamble may have developed both from occupational terminology and from lineage-based identifiers.

As with many Indian surnames, there is no single, uniform origin, and multiple historical processes likely contributed to its adoption across different regions and communities.

== Historical spread and social usage ==
Unlike surnames confined to a single caste or religious group, Kamble is notable for its cross-caste and cross-religious distribution. This reflects the fluid nature of surname adoption in Maharashtra, particularly from the medieval period onward.

The surname is recorded among various Marathi-speaking groups, including:

- Maratha and Maratha-Kunbi communities
- Kunbi (agrarian communities)
- Certain Brahmin subgroups, including Karhade and Panchal
- Artisan and occupational communities such as Shimpi (tailors), Lohar (blacksmiths), Vani (traders), and Vishwakarma (Panchal or Vishwabrahmin)
- Pastoral and agrarian groups such as Dhangar and Bhoi
- Nomadic and semi-nomadic communities, including some classified under NT-B
- Scheduled Castes, including Mahar, Mang (Matang), and related communities
- Jain communities, including Saitwal Jains
- Neo-Buddhist communities following the Ambedkarite Buddhist movement

In regions such as Satara district, the surname is shared by Maratha-Kunbi, Maratha, Mahar, and Teli communities, illustrating its regional diffusion beyond rigid caste boundaries.

== Kamble and Buddhist (Neo-Buddhist) history ==
=== Background: Buddhism and Maharashtra ===
Maharashtra has a long association with Buddhism, dating back to ancient India. The region contains numerous early Buddhist sites, including cave complexes and monastic centres. However, Buddhism declined in the region over centuries, and many formerly Buddhist communities were absorbed into the Hindu caste order.

In the 20th century, Buddhism re-emerged in Maharashtra through the Neo-Buddhist movement led by Dr. B. R. Ambedkar, who embraced Buddhism in 1956 along with hundreds of thousands of followers, primarily from Mahar and other Scheduled Caste communities. This conversion marked not only a religious shift but also a profound social and political transformation.

=== The surname Kamble among Neo-Buddhists ===
A significant number of individuals bearing the surname Kamble are found among Neo-Buddhist (Navayana) communities in Maharashtra. For many families, the surname predates conversion and was retained after adopting Buddhism, reflecting continuity of identity alongside religious change.

Among Neo-Buddhists, the surname Kamble is particularly associated with:

- Ambedkarite social movements
- Dalit literature and autobiography
- Political activism and grassroots leadership
- Trade unionism and educational reform

Several prominent Kamble individuals emerged as writers, activists, politicians, and intellectuals who articulated Buddhist ethics, social equality, and resistance to caste discrimination.

=== Dalit–Buddhist literary tradition ===
The Neo-Buddhist movement in Maharashtra gave rise to a powerful Dalit literary tradition, and individuals with the surname Kamble have played an important role in this cultural sphere.

Dalit–Buddhist literature often focuses on:

- Lived experiences of caste oppression
- Rejection of ritual hierarchy
- Assertion of human dignity
- Buddhist values such as compassion (karuṇā), wisdom (prajñā), and equality

Writers such as Babytai Kamble and Shantabai Kamble are widely regarded as pioneers in Dalit autobiographical writing. Their works document both personal experiences and broader social realities, especially those faced by Dalit women in pre- and post-conversion Maharashtra.

=== Political and Ambedkarite activism ===
Individuals with the surname Kamble have also been active in:

- Republican and Ambedkarite political parties
- Labour and trade union movements
- Social reform organisations
- Campaigns for constitutional rights, reservations, and social justice

For Neo-Buddhists, the surname Kamble does not denote a religious caste identity but rather functions as a historical family name, coexisting with a consciously adopted Buddhist ethical and philosophical identity.

== Religious diversity ==
While strongly represented among Neo-Buddhists, the surname Kamble is not exclusive to Buddhism. It continues to be used by:

- Hindu communities across multiple castes
- Jain communities, particularly Saitwal Jains
- Individuals who identify culturally rather than religiously

This plural usage highlights the distinction between surname identity and religious affiliation in Maharashtra.

== Notable people ==
People with the surname Kamble have made contributions in politics, literature, art, social reform, and public life. These include writers, painters, legislators, activists, and professionals, many of whom have been associated with progressive, reformist, or Ambedkarite movements.

- Arun Krushnaji Kamble (1953–2009), Indian Marathi writer, politician and activist
- Arvind Kamble, Indian politician
- B. C. Kamble (1919–2006), Indian politician, writer, editor, jurist, and social activist
- Babytai Kamble (1929–2012), Indian Dalit activist and writer
- Bhausaheb Malhari Kamble, Indian politician
- D. N. P. Kamble (Devrao Namdevrao Pathrikar Kamble), Indian politician from the 1950s
- Dilip Kamble (born 1963), Indian politician
- G. Kamble (Gopal Balwant Kamble, 1918–2002), Indian painter
- Milind Kamble, Indian entrepreneur
- Milind Anna Kamble, Indian politician
- N. M. Kamble (Narendra Marutrao Kamble,1925–2021), Indian politician
- Nivruti Satwaji Kamble, Indian politician of the 1970s
- Pramod Kamble (born 1964), Indian painter and sculptor
- Ranjit Kamble, Indian politician
- Shantabai Kamble (1923–2023), Indian Marathi writer and Dalit activist
- Shivaji Kamble, Indian politician
- Sunil Kamble, Indian politician
- Sunita Kamble, Indian veterinarian
- T. M. Kamble (d. 2013), Indian politician and Ambedkarite activist
- Tulsiram Kamble, Indian politician of the 1960s and 1970s
- Uttam Kamble, Indian journalist and author

== Sociological significance ==
From a sociological perspective, Kamble serves as an example of how Maharashtrian surnames:

- Transcend rigid caste classifications
- Reflect occupational, regional, and clan-based origins
- Persist across major religious transformations, including conversion to Buddhism
- Become associated with social reform and resistance movements

In Neo-Buddhist contexts, the surname symbolizes historical continuity without ritual hierarchy, aligning with Ambedkar's rejection of caste-based identity while retaining cultural heritage.

== See also ==
- Neo-Buddhism in Maharashtra
- Ambedkarite movement
- Dalit literature
- Marathi surnames
