= Atpadi =

Town in Maharashtra

- Town and Tehsil
- Location in Maharashtra, India
- Coordinates: 17.25°N 74.57°E
- Country: India
- State: Maharashtra
- District: Sangli

Population (2011)
  - Total: 20,791

Languages
  - Official: Marathi
- Time zone: UTC+5:30 (IST)
- PIN: 415301
- Telephone code: 912343
- Vehicle registration: MH 10

Atpadi is an administrative town of the Atpadi Taluka of Sangli District in the Indian state of Maharashtra. Atpadi is located north-east of Sangli District and shares borders with the adjacent Solapur and Satara Districts. The town has a taluka administrative office (that is, a panchayat samiti local government body), a courthouse, a police station, a government-run primary hospital, various schools and colleges and a theater. Atpadi's economy is based on the cultivation and sale of agricultural products, with pomegranates and cotton constituting the core of the industry. The town is home to the Manganga Sahakari Sugar factory, a pomegranate auction center and various small scale industries in fields such as manufacturing, processing, servicing and repairs.

The town can lay claim to a literary connection, with four prominent Marathi authors originating from Atpadi.

== History ==
The history of Atpadi before the 15th/16th century is not documented. Some editions of the Stahala Purana mention the town Atpade (अटपडे), but the date of the writing is undocumented. In historic times, Atpadi was part of the Manank yadav kingdom of Mandesh, ruled from the nearby village of Devapur. In the 16th century, Atapdi was part of the Adilshahi kingdom of Bijapur. In the 19th century, it became part of the princely state of Aundh as well as a palace city, hence it was called Atpadi Mahal. After Indian independence and the merging of Aundh into the Republic of India, Atpadi was in Khanapur Taluka in the Satara district until the new district Sangli was formed. After the formation of the new district, Atpadi was separated from Khanapur Taluka and made an administrative division (Taluka). Prominent Marathi writers like the late G.D.Madgulkar (गदिमा), the late Vyankatesh Madgulkar, the late Shankar Rao Kharat, the late N.S. Inamdar, the late Arun Kamble and the former petroleum minister of India, Ram Naik were from Atpadi.

== Geography ==
=== Town ===
Atpadi is located at Latitude: 17° 25' 0 N, Longitude: 74° 57' 0 E with a population of approximately 25000.

The only language used in the town is Marathi.

The northern area of Atpadi has government administration office, a government hospital, courthouse, police station, electricity board office, colleges and newly formed colonies. Major developments of the new Atpadi area are on the north side of town, while the south side of town is old and more populated. The southern part serves as a commercial center and as the downtown area of Atpadi. It has the MSRTC bus stand and the old government hospital. The old Atpadi town has a market place for the weekly bazaar (vegetable, fruit, cattle market), a designated road for shops known as Peth.

The residential areas in old town is dominated by families from the caste/with the surname Galli.

Different galis are named as Wani Galli, Brahman Galli, Navhi Galli, Kosthi Galli, Kasar Galli, Deshmukh Galli, Kumbhar Galli, and Parit Galli. Other newly formed residential colonies are Choundeshwari colony, Vidya Nagar, Sathe Nagar, Phule Nagar, and Vithal Sampat nagar.

=== Surrounding area and villages ===
Atpadi is surrounded by small farming hamlets from all directions of town known as waadi. These places hold houses of farmers grouped into communities. They lack commercial markets or higher education schools. The surrounding areas depend on the Atpadi for trading agricultural produce and for education. Their proximity to the town area, the expansion of the town with a growing population, infrastructural needs and well connected roads are making surrounding areas become part of the town.

- Bhingewadi: Bhingewadi is a small grampanchat village located 3 kilometers to the north-west of the Atpadi Town. Bhingewadi is populated mostly by farmers whose surname is Bhinge, thus the name Bhingewadi. Bhingewadi is a small village of 2000 people with much farmland. Wheat, jowar, bajara, and pomegranate are the main produce from the farmlands. It is adjacent to Swatantrapur.
- Bombewadi: Located on the east side of Atpadi City
- Awalai: Situated between Dinghachi village and Atpadi, near village Nimbawade
- Deshmukhwaadi: Situated to the east of Atpadi
- Yamaji Patalachi Wadi: Located on the Atpadi-Sangola road
- Mapate Mala: Located on the Atpad-Nimbawade road to the north-west
- Sonarsiddhnagar: Located on the Atpadi-Kouthuli road. It has the industrial colony of Manganga Sugar Factory.
- Kouthuli: Located near Manganga river and Manganga Sugar Factory
- Swatantrapur: Located between Atpadi lake and Bhingewadi. It is a free custodian colony built in 1939. The Hindi cinema, Do ankhe baraah haath, is based in Swatantrapur.
- Location of Atpadi with respect to surrounding area and other major towns.
- Nimbavade: located between Atpadi and Zare
- Anusewadi: located between Atpadi and Nimbavade. The way goes from Atpadi Police Station to Nimbavade through crossing the small village Anusewadi. The large shepherd community in this village tend flocks of sheep and goats.

=== Season ===
Summer, monsoon rain and winter are the main three seasons year-round. The region falls under the rain-shadow area, resulting in less rain.

Atpadi

Climate chart (precipitation, max. and min. temperature)
J	F	M	A	M	J	J	A	S	O	N	D
0 0 0	34 0 0	0 0 0	0 0 0	0 0 0	0 0 0	50 0 0	140 0 0	140 0 0	97 0 0	0 0 0	3 0 0
- █ Average max. and min. temperatures in °C
- █ Precipitation totals in mm
- Source: 1984 Rainfall data from Department of Agriculture of Maharashtra
Imperial conversion
J	F	M	A	M	J	J	A	S	O	N	D
0 32 32	1.3 32 32	0 32 32	0 32 32	0 32 32	0 32 32	2 32 32	5.5 32 32	5.5 32 32	3.8 32 32	0 32 32	0.1 32 32
- █ Average max. and min. temperatures in °F
- █ Precipitation totals in inches

==== Water resources ====
The only source for drinking water in Atpadi is a lake 3 km away from town. The Shuk Odha (stream) and Manganga River are near Atpadi. Both are generally active only during the monsoon season. Various water canals were projected into the Atpadi Taluka under Khrishna Khore Vikas Mahamandal's scheme named Tembhu.

=== Forest area ===
Atpadi has a forest office near Swatantrapur. Dubai Kuran (डबई कुरण) is a reserved forest area. It has a plantation of babool trees. Initially this area was created as a grazing ground for cattle in summer. Cattle grazing is no longer allowed as it is a reserved forest area. Wild animals like wolf, jackal, porcupine, fox, Asian palm civet and wild hare can be seen here.

== Political and judiciary system ==
The Atpadi town has a nagar panchayat for the administration of the town. In the May 2018 election, Vrushali Patil was elected by the people as a sarpanch for next five years, while the Panchayat Samiti is to administer the entire taluka.

Atpadi is part of the Atpadi-Khanapur constituency of Vidhan Sabha and the Maharashtra State Sangli constituency of Loksabha. The Atpadi Magistrate's Court oversees criminal proceedings while the Civil Court is presided over by the Junior Division of the court. The Atpadi Police Station maintains law and order.

The old building of Atpadi Grampanchayat was renovated, though the original design of the building remained unchanged.

The late Annasaheb Lengare was the elected MLA from Atpadi-Kavathemhankal Constituency. Atpadi was separated from Kavathemhankal and joined to Khanapur. In 1995, Rajendra Deshmukh was elected as a MLA from Atpadi-Khanapur constituency. Now Gopichand Padalkar is a member of Maharashtra Legislative Council. He was elected to the Legislative Council by MLAs (unopposed) on 14 May 2020.

== Industry ==
Atpadi's industry is based on agriculture and dairy products as well as secondary industries. Industries are located around the Atpadi town. Industries have created jobs and business for people living around Atpadi. The sugar factory is the largest of all industries in Atpadi. A program called Khadi gramodyog was started by the Government of India to promote rural employment for women.

- Sugar factory: Manganga Sugar Factory
- Cotton mill: Babasaheb Deshmukh Shetkari Sahakari Sutgirani
- Dairy milk: Packaged milk under the brand "Family No. 1" (previously 'Sakaal')
- Domestic industry of woolen blankets (Gongade/Kambal घोंगडे /कंबळ)
- Khadi Gramodyog

== Travel and entertainment ==
Atpadi is connected by road and falls on the state highway between Solapur and Karad. It can be accessed from Solapur, Sangli, Kolhapur, Karad, Pune and Mumbai and adjacent towns through state transport buses as well as private buses. Atpadi has a MSRTC bus stand and depot. The MSRTC bus is a preferred mode of transport by most people. Atpadi has a few lodges and a number of hotels and road-side joints. Siddhanath Chitrmandir is the only functioning cinema/theater, offering Marathi and Hindi movies. Shreeram Talkies, a pavilion based cinema screen became defunct in the 1990s.

=== Points of interest ===
- Swatantrapur – free custodian colony
- Atpadi Lake (Atpadi Pazar Talav / Atpadi Tale)
- Rajewadi talav
- Sonarshiddh Temple
- Siddhnath temple, Kharsundi
- Ram Mandir, Karagani
- Kalleshwar Madhir & Uttreshwar mandhir, Atpadi
- Shukachari Hills in Hivtad – place of ancient sage Shukmuni (Śuka), son of Vyas
- Jakai Devi Mandir near Manewadi – temple surrounded by hills and near a lake
- Bhupalgad

== Education ==
Atpadi has schools and colleges. Bachelor's degrees are offered in Science, Arts, Commerce, Education and Engineering.

Colleges:

- Shrimant Babasaheb Deshmukh Mahavidyalaya Atpadi (Arts, Science and Commerce)
- Kala Vidnyan Mahavidyalaya affiliated to Shivaji University, Kolhapur
- Abasaheb Khebudkar Junior College of Science, Atpadi

Schools:

- Shree Bhavani High School
- S.V.D.D. Girl's High School
- Rajaram Bapu High School

All high schools are affiliated to the SSC/HSC board, Kolhapur.

Professional courses:

- Industrial Training Institute, Atpadi (ITI college); various D.Ed. colleges and Agriculture Diploma College, Bhingewadi
- Sriram Society's Engineering and Diploma College
- D.Ed and B.Ed College
- AK Junior College of Science

== Medical service ==
Government Primary Hospital is that major medical facility in Atpadi, supported by various private clinics, hospitals and laboratories.

== Art and culture ==
=== Literature ===
Atpadi has produced four presidents of Marathi Sahitya Sammelan. The author and poet, Adhunik Walmiki, popularly known as GaDiMa (गदिमा), and G. D. Madgulkar are from the nearby village, Madgule. His younger brother, Venkatesh Madgulkar, as well as Shankar Rao Kharat and N. S. Inamdar, are other authors from Atpadi. The late Prof. Arun Kamble, a prominent Marathi writer, was born in Atpadi Taluka.

The Marathi book Mandeshi Manase (People of Mandesh), written by Venkatesh Madgulkar, is based on characters in Atpadi and is set in Atpadi and its surrounding areas. The autobiography of Shankar Rao Kharat Taral-Antaral has a detailed chapter on Atpadi before the independence of India.

- MaanDarshan: Aamagazine published from Atpadi
- Vyatha Pinjryatil Pakhranchya: Kavi Shriram Anuse, a Mandeshi poet.
- Punha Ek Navi Disha: by author Nitin Machhindra Anuse

=== Folk dance, songs and sports ===
Folk dance and songs, known as gaji and dhangari owi respectively, are hallmarks of the Maandesh culture.

Rural sports like soil wrestling and Kabaddi are held annually at various annual fairs. Modern sports like cricket and volleyball are other popular sports.

Namdev Wadare, a Shivchhatrapati State award-winning wrestler, started a wrestling institute in Atpadi where the western style of wrestling is taught.

== Agriculture and cattle ==
Jowar, maize, wheat, cotton, sugarcane, bajari and pomegranate are the main agricultural produce in Atpadi. Pomegranate plantations are quite new and modern irrigation techniques, like drip irrigation, have helped local farmers to grow pomegranate fields. Being an export product to Middle-East and Arab nations, pomegranate has given higher yields to farmers than traditional crop-based farming. The low monsoon rainfall is advantageous to farmers as the pomegranate is a desert tree.

The Khillari bull (Atpadi Mahal) breed is well adapted to the tropical and drought prone conditions present in this part of the world. They are favoured by the local farming community due to their ability to handle the hardships of farming.

Buffalo, sheep and goat are also raised.

Sheti Pariwar Kalyan Sanstha, Atpadi in Maharashtra faces drought and lacks irrigation facilities, making goat and sheep farming popular for economic sustainability. Traditional goat farming methods were time-consuming, leading to youth migration. In 1975, Shri. Narayanrao Deshpande founded 'Sheti Pariwar Kalyan Sanstha' for agricultural development and experimented with stall-fed goat farming, successfully developing the Osmanabadi breed. They also grew specific fodder trees for goats on dry and waste land, now taught through training programs. Sheti Pariwar is now known for training in stall-fed goat rearing, breed development, and new agricultural methodologies.

== Temples and festivals ==
The Atpadi town as well as the Atpadi Taluka has various temples. Uttareshwar is a patron god of the Atpadi town and a 15‑day fair is held in Atpadi for Uttareshwar. The pulling of a wooden chariot by men is one of the rituals of the fair. Kharsundi, a place in the Atpadi Taluka, is the highest seat of Lord Siddhanath. Apart from the Hindu temples, Atpadi has a Mosque. Atpadi has a unique temple dedicated to Yoga and suryanamaskar called 'Suryopasana Mandir', though this is not a religious place. Suryopasana Mandir serves as a community hall for people who wish to practice yoga and exercise suryanamaskar.

South door of Kalleshwar Mandir, Atpadi

List of temples in Atpadi

- Nath Baba (Bhingewadi Road)
- Jotiba (Bhingewadi Road)
- Sai Mandir (Bhingewadi Road)
- AAI Saheb mandir (wife of Saint Gondavalekar maharaj) (Brahmin Galli)
- Vitthal Mandir (near ST Stand)
- Kalleshwar (center)
- Vitthal Mandir (near the post office)
- Ram mandir (Brahman Galli)
- Datta mandir (Brahman Galli)
- Ramnath Buwa mandir (Peth)
- Uttareshwar (bajar Patangan, patron god of Atpadi
- Kala Maruti (bajar Patangan)
- Khandoba (bajar Patangan)
- Yellama (bajar Patangan)
- Math (Wani Galli)
- Laandaa Maruti (Prakashwadi)
- Tambada Maruti (Deshmukh Galli)
- Vetal (Prakashwadi)
- Parmeshwar Mandir (Shukra Odha)
- Sonarsiddha Mandir (Sonarsiddhwadi)
- Narsoba Mandir located at various places in town (five in all)
- Ganesh Mandir (Ambabai Odha)
- Ambabai mandir (Ambabai Odha)
- Tulajapurche Thanake (Karkhana Road)
- Choundeshwari Mandir
- Mayakka Mandir (Sathe chowk)

Priests offering prayers to Siddhanath, Kharsundi

List of other temples from Atpadi taluka

- Siddhanath Mandir – Kharsundi, Seat of Lord Siddhanath, Avtar of Lord Shiva
- Biroba Mandir – Anusewadi
- Duloba Mandir – Nimbavade
- Lakhmeshwar (Shivaling worshipped by Lakshman, brother of Shriram during Ramayan period, hence known as Lakhmeshwar) and Shriram Mandir – Karagani
- Shukachari Cave – Shukachari
- JakaiDevi Mandir – Nelkaranji, place of the wife of Lord Siddhanath
- Jotiba Mandir – Madgule
- Khandoba Mandir – Madgule
- Marimata Mandir – Avalai
- Siddhanath Mandir – Shetphale
- Bhaktabai Mandir – Shetphale
- Jogeshwari Mandir – Shetphale.
- Masoba Mandir – Banpuri
- BhavaniTemple – Dighanchi
- Hanuman Mandir – Pimpri Budruk
- Sidhatnath Mandir- Pimpri Budruk, believed to be a place for curing snake bites
- Jotirling Mandir – Tadawale
- Ganesh Mandir (Patrewadi) – 14 May
- Vithoba Mandir Balewadi (Yamgarvasti)
- Hanuman Mandir Balewadi
- Shri Nath Baba Mandir – Jambhulani (Suraj Ukse)

=== Festivals ===
Diwali, the main festival of Hindus, other festivals like Ganesh Chaturthi and the Muslim festival, Muharram, are celebrated publicly. Apart from religious festivals, a town fair devoted to the patron god of Atpadi, Uttareshwar, is held after Diwali for 3 days.

- Uttareshwar jatra – Atpadi, major fair of the area starting from Kartik Pornima and lasting the next 15 days
- Gnyaneshwer Parayan Sohala-Tadavale 2 May per year
- Akhand Harinam Saptha (Jotiba Mandir) – Madgule, held every April
- Paravarcha Melava (G. D. Madgulkar Janma divas 1 October) – Shetphale
- Ashtami Yatra – Shetphale. Chaitra Vadya Ashtami
- Khandoba Jatra – Madgule
- Yallama devi yatra, Jotiba yatra – Gomewadi
- Marimi Aai Yatra – Tadawale
- Marimata Jatra – Avalai
- Paush yatra – Kharsundi, famous for its khillari cattle trade in Maharashtra, Karnataka and Andhra
- Chaitra yatra – Kharsundi (Saasan/Shaasan Kaathi)
- Jakai yatra – Nelkaranji
- Masoba Jatra – Banpuri. This festival starts from Shalivahan Shak, the Hindu new year (Gudhipadava), and lasts for 5 days.
- Hanuman Jatra Festival – Pimpri Budruk
- Hanuman Sidhanath jatra at Shuknagar (Hivtad)
- Hari nam saptaha Balewadi
- Mahalakshmi Temple Bombewadi

=== Distance from major cities ===
- Sangli – 90 km
- Kolhapur – 135 km
- Pune – 240 km
- Hyderabad – 450 km
- Solapur – 120 km
- Pandharpur – 60 km
- Karad – 100 km
- Satara – 120 km
- Mumbai – 400 km
- Nagpur – 777 km
