= Lotewadi =

Village in Maharashtra

Lotewadi is a village situated in Sangole Taluka of Solapur district in the Indian state Maharashtra. Village is situated on the border of Solapur and Sangli District. On the bank of Manganga river. It is famous for Mhasoba temple.

== Geography ==
There are three main parts in Lotewadi are Navi Lotewadi, Juni Lotewadi and Satarkar Vasti. Manganga river flowing through Lotewadi. Weather is warm and dry. Several small lakes are present like Bandoba lake. Annual rainfall is very less. Nearby big cities are Atpadi, Sangola, Dighanchi, Mhaswad, and Pandharpur.

== Religion ==
Ancient Mhasoba temple of Lotewadi is very famous in Mandesh and region of its nearby districts like Solapur, Sangli and Satara. Temple is owned by the Chhatrapati Shivaji maharaj's descendent Udayanraje Bhosale. The annual turnover at the temple is @ 5 crores. The Mhasoba Temple is very Crowded place on the Amavasya Day. All the peoples surrounded to lotewadi @ 50 km comes to here on Amavasya. The crowd on Amavasya day is around 10,000 to 20,000 people.Udayanraje Bhosale family has own Rajwada in the Lotewadi. Also Maruti temple and Mayakka devi temple is present in Village.

== Economy ==
Main profession of villagers is farming and animal husbundry. Farmers are taking cash crop of pomegranate in large quantity. Other crops are Jowar, Bajara, Maize etc. The royal Udayanraje Bhosale family has few hundreds of hectare land in Lotewadi, which they have given to the farmers of Lotewadi for the Farming. All the Peoples in Lotewadi Prouds of the Chatrapati Shivaji. Other Professions are health services, Government And private jobs, much number of peoples of village are migrated to Mumbai for job and settled there. Many Teachers and doctors of village serving in various parts of Maharastra. Also many people are acquired profession of manufacturing of gold and silver in various parts of country like Mumbai, Rajasthan, Bihar, West Bengal, Nepal etc.

== Demography ==
Lotewadi is a large village located in Sangole Taluka of Solapur district, Maharashtra with total 473 families residing. The Lotewadi village has population of 2363 of which 1236 are males while 1127 are females as per population census 2011. The peoples of Ssrname Lavate are in majority in Lotewadi. Other surnames in Lotewadi are Sargar, Kale, Kalebag, Javir, Deshmukh, Kate, Jadhav, Shejal, Dhere, More, Mote, Kumbhar, Kasar, Kengar, Deshpande, Kulkarni, Mane, Shembade, Sawant, Sartape, Sathe, Dhandore, Chavhan, Hajare, Sutar, Kolekar, and others.

== Politics ==
Lotewadi village has Grampanchayat status. Sarpanch of village is Namdev Lavate of Shivsena party. Political people in Lotewadi are Namdev Lavate, Uttam Khandekar, Popat Sawant, Adv. Shankar Sargar, Dada Lavate, Ulhas Dhere, Ramchandra Lavate, Ashok mote, Rahul Sawant, Kolekar, Ramchandra Patil, Ramhari Sawant. Prominent political parties are Peasants and Workers Party of India (शेकाप) and Shivsena.

== Education ==
Approximately 85% peoples of village are literate. Large number of peoples are higher educated. There is one Secondary school of Sangola taluka shetkari shikshan prasarak mandal, Lotewadi named as New English school, Lotewadi Established in 1968. There are four primary schools of Zilla Parishad 1. ZPPS navi lotewadi ZPPS 2. juni lotewadi 3. ZPPS satarkar vasti 4. ZPPS shembade vasti. Also some Anganwadi centres are present. The students goes outside for the higher education purpose.

== Health ==
One health sub-centre of government and few private clinics are present. Trend of education in health services is seen in youth of village. Many doctors of village giving services in big cities of state.
