= Do Ankhen Barah Haath =

1957 film by V. Shantaram

- Theatrical release poster
- Directed by: V. Shantaram
- Written by: G. D. Madgulkar
- Story by: G. D. Madgulkar
- Produced by: V. Shantaram
- Starring: V. Shantaram; Sandhya
- Cinematography: G. Balkrishna
- Edited by: Chintamani Borkar
- Music by: Vasant Desai
- Production company: Rajkamal Kalamandir
- Distributed by: Rajkamal Kalamandir
- Release date: 1957
- Running time: 143 minutes
- Country: India
- Language: Hindi
- Box office: ₹1.25 crore

Do Ankhen Barah Haath (transl. Two Eyes, Twelve Hands) is a 1957 Indian Hindi-language drama film directed by V. Shantaram, who also starred. It is considered to be one of the classics of Hindi cinema and is based on humanistic psychology. It won a Silver Bear at the 8th Berlin International Film Festival and a Golden Globe Award in the Samuel Goldwyn International Film Award for best film produced outside of the United States category. The film is also remembered for the song "Aye Maalik Tere Bande Hum", sung by Lata Mangeshkar and written by Bharat Vyas.

The inspiration for this movie was a real experiment conducted by Maurice Frydman, who refused to have his name credited at the end of the film. He went so far as to tell the movie maker, V Shantaram, that he would sue him in court if his name were to appear anywhere in the credits. This incident is relayed in an interview of David Godman, who talks about Maurice Frydman's extraordinary life and connection to India.

The film was inspired by the story of an "open prison" experiment: Swatantrapur in the princely state of Aundh near Satara. Now, Swatantrapur is part of Atpadi tehsil in Sangli district of Maharashtra. It was recounted by screenwriter G. D. Madgulkar to V. Shantaram. In 2005, Indiatimes Movies ranked the movie amongst the Top 25 Must See Bollywood Films. During filming, V. Shantaram fought with a bull and injured an eye, but his eyesight survived. The film was later remade in 1975 as the Tamil language film Pallandu Vazhga, in 1976 as the Telugu language film Maa Daivam, and in 2023 as the Malayalam language film Jailer. The core plot line is thematically similar to the 1952 movie My Six Convicts.

== Plot ==
The film portrays a young jail warden Adinath, who rehabilitates six dangerous prisoners released on parole to persons of virtue.

He takes these notorious, often surly murderers and makes them work hard with him on a dilapidated country farm, rehabilitating them through hard work and kind guidance as they eventually produce a great harvest.

The film ends with the death of the warden at the hands of the oxen of a corrupt enemy who wants no competition in the profitable market he controls.

The film takes the viewers through several scenes that set a strong moral lesson that through hard work, dedication and concentration a person can accomplish anything. It also explains that if people focus their energy on a worthy cause, success is guaranteed. In the final scene, all six thieves became hardworking persons and decided to live at that hut where they learn all things because they think the two eyes of Adinath are observing them whether they are doing good things or bad and they raise their hands to salute the positive energy of Adinath and film ends with the song sung by Champa and one of the favourite songs of Adinath, "Aye Maalik Tere Bande Hum".

== Promotion ==
Noted painter G. Kamble was hired by Shantaram to paint the movie posters. Kamble produced a 350-ft banner at Bombay's Opera House in 1957.

== Cast ==
- V. Shantaram as Adinath
- Sandhya as Champa
- Baburao Pendharkar as Superintendent
- Ulhas as Shanker Passi
- B. M. Vyas as Jalia Nai

== Soundtrack ==
Song	Singer	Raga
"Ae Malik Tere Bande Hum"	Lata Mangeshkar	Bhairav (raga)
"Main Gaun, Tu Chup Ho Ja"	Lata Mangeshkar	
"Saiyan Jhuthon Ka Bada"	Lata Mangeshkar	
"Tak Tak Dhum Dhum"	Lata Mangeshkar	
"Umad Ghumadkar Aayi Re Ghata, Kare Kare Badra Ki Chhayi Re Ghata"	Lata Mangeshkar, Manna Dey	Megh Malhar

== Awards ==
Year	Category	Cast/Crew member	Status
National Film Awards
1957	Best Feature Film	V. Shantaram	Won
1957	Best Feature Film in Hindi	V. Shantaram	Won
Berlin International Film Festival
1958	Silver Bear Extraordinary Jury Prize	V. Shantaram	Won
Golden Globe Awards
1959	Samuel Goldwyn International Film Award	V. Shantaram	Won

== See also ==
- List of Indian winners and nominees of the Golden Globe Awards
- My Six Convicts (autobiographical story of Donald Powell Wilson)
- The Dirty Dozen
