= Shukachari =

Village in Maharashtra

- Village
- Location within Maharashtra Location within India
- Coordinates: 17°13′32″N 74°50′50″E
- Country: India
- State: Maharashtra
- District: Sangli

Shukachari is a hill station located in the mountainous region known as The Mahadev Hills between Atpadi and Khanapur of Sangli district, Maharashtra, India. As per the Puranas this place is believed to be the place of the epic sage Shukamuni or Shuka, son of Vyas. This is a very popular place in Atpadi Taluka, people come from all over India. This is famous for its big stones and the Dark Forest as well as a water source from the mountain peaks.

== History ==
As per tradition, this place is where ancient epic sage, Shuka vanished in stones, hence becoming his last resting place. The place where Shuka believed to be merged into stones is a cave. Around the cave a temple dedicated to Lord Shiva is built. The place Shukachari is surrounded by Mahadeva Hills and dense forests. There is a continuous flow of underground water called Ganga - Holy Water from GoMukh which is called Jivant Zhara by faith and has a great significance in ancient Indian history. Shukachari is a resting place for Tapashcharya called Deep Meditation. The architecture of Shukachari temple suggest it was built in the 14 to 16th centuries probably in the Chalukya period.

Shukachari is situated at Khanapur & Atpadi Taluka in Sangli District. A historical place called Banurgad or Bhupalgad fort which is situated 3 km from "Shukachari" in "Khanapur taluka" of Sangli district.

A tomb of Bahirji Naik (Shivaji maharaj's Chief of Intelligence, Indian spy, military commander and an efficient soldier, and notable Ramoshi-Berad in the army of Shivaji Maharaj in the time of the Mughal Empire) is situated at Banurgad/Bhupalgad fort in Khanapur taluka of Sangli district.

== Saints from Shukachari ==
- Taponidhi Narayanagiri Maharaj
- Taponidhi Krishnagiri Maharaj (Locally called as Taponidhi Kisangiri Maharaj)

== Villages Situated Near Shukachari ==
At - Kusbawade, Post - Palashi, Taluka - Khanapur, Dist - Sangli, pincode - 415307

At - Tadachiwadi(Shukhnagar), Taluka - Khanapur, Dist - Sangli, pincode - 415307.

At - Banurgad/Bhupalgad, Taluka - Khanapur, Dist - Sangli, pincode - 415307.

At - Palashi, Taluka - Khanapur, Dist - Sangli, pincode - 415307.

== Location ==
Its location is the border of Solapur and Sangli districts. This place is well connected by road from Atpadi, Vita, Maharashtra.

== Festival ==
A month-long festival is held in Indian calendar month 'Shravan', roughly falling in July–August.
