= Ace Against Odds =

- Front Cover
- Author: Sania Mirza, Shivani Gupta, Imran Mirza
- Language: English
- Genre: Autobiography
- Publisher: HarperCollins India
- Publication date: July 2016
- Publication place: India
- Media type: illustrated
- Pages: 256 pages
- ISBN: 9789351362630

Ace Against Odds is the 2016 biography of the Indian professional tennis player Sania Mirza. The book is her official biography chronicling her journey to becoming one of India and world's top female tennis player. The book also contains some memorable encounters of the player on and off the court and the people and relationships that have contributed to her growth as a person and a sportsperson.

The book was released at the hands of Shah Rukh Khan at a function in Hyderabad in July 2016.

== See also ==
- Sania Mirza
- Tennis in India
- List of autobiographies by Indians
