= Shukeshwar Nath Mahadev Mandir =

Hindu temple in Mithila region, India

- शुकेश्वर नाथ महादेव मंदिर

Religion
- Affiliation: Hinduism
- District: Sitamarhi district
- Festival: Mahashivratri

Location
- Location: Basbitta village, Majorganj Block, Mithila region
- State: Bihar
- Country: India
- Interactive map of Shukeshwar Nath Mahadev Mandir

Architecture
- Type: Hinduism
- Established: Sage Shukhadeva

Shukeshwar Nath Mahadev Mandir is a Hindu temple dedicated to Shiva in the Sitamarhi district of Mithila region in Bihar, India. It is believed that the central Shivalinga of the mandir was established by the sage Shuka.

== Etymology ==
Shukeshwar, an epithet of Shiva, is a compound Indic word formed from the combination of the words Shuka and Ishwar. The literal meaning of the term Shukeshwar is 'deity of Shuka'. The term Ishwar refers Shiva, who is also known as Mahadev; thus the temple is known as Shukeshwar Nath Mahadev Mandir.

== Legend ==
According to legend, the sage Shuka had established the Shiva linga here in Basbitta village and worshiped Shiva while going to Janakpur (capital of Mithila) to participate in svayamvara ceremony of princess Sita. King Janaka of Mithila also worshipped here. It is said that the Shiva appeared before Shuka and Janaka. According to legend, the sages who took part in the svayamvara of Sita held at the court of King Janaka in Mithila, built the temple while returning from the svayamvara.

== Description ==
The temple of Baba Shukeshwar Nath Mahadev is an important centre of faith for the people both culturally tied nations of India and Nepal in the Indian subcontinent. The Bholenath of the temple is settled in the hearts and minds of the people of both the countries The devotees of the both nations come here to perform the sacred ritual of Jalabhisheka on the Shivalinga of the temple.
