= Arun Krushnaji Kamble =

Indian politician

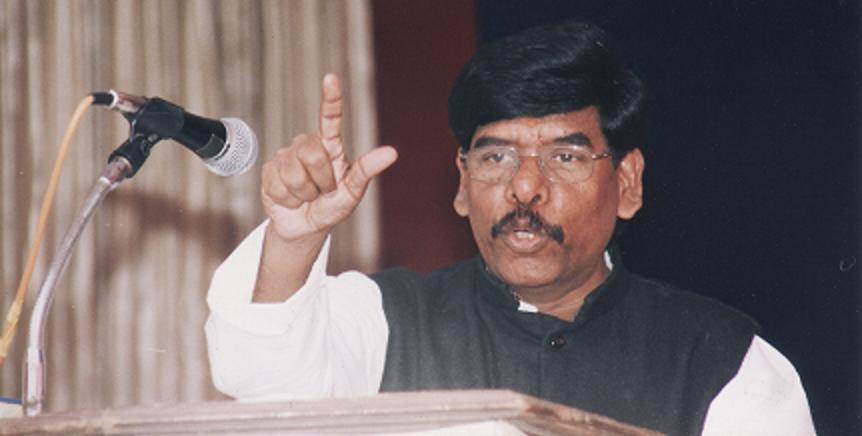
- Arun Kamble
- Born: 14 March 1953; Kargani, Athpadi, Sangli, Maharashtra, India
- Died: 20 December 2009 (aged 56); Hyderabad, India
- Known for: Dalit rights movement Dalit Buddhist movement Dalit Panther Of India; Ambedkarism
- Notable work: Cultural struggle in Ramayana; Janata; Conversion of Dr. B.R.Ambedkar; Epoch Maker Ambedkar
- Political party: Dalit Panther, Janata Dal
- Children: Aparant Kamble; Ashutosh Kamble
- Mother: Shantabai Kamble
- Website: arunkamble.com

Arun Krushnaji Kamble (14 March 1953 – 20 December 2009) was an Indian Marathi language writer, professor, Politician, and Dalit activist. Arun Kamble, President and one of the founding members of Dalit Panthers of India, worked as a Head of Marathi department at University of Mumbai. He was the National General Secretary of Janata Dal. He took many major decisions in favour of Dalit, Backward Class and Minorities.

== Introduction ==
Kamble in early age

Kamble formed Dalit Panther of India as a social organisation alongside Namdeo Dhasal and Raja Dhale in 1976. Later Kamble became the National General Secretary of Janata Dal and worked with former Prime Minister V. P. Singh. He demanded the renaming of Marathwada University to "Dr. Babasaheb Ambedkar University". Kamble, a writer, poet and editor, authored many books such as Cultural Struggle in Ramayana, Conversion of Dr. Babasaheb Ambedkar, Cheevar, Vaad-Samvad, Yug-Pravartak Ambedkar, Chalvaliche Diwas, and Tarkateerth Ek Vadato-Vyaghyat. He was awarded with many accolades such as "The Prabuddha Ratna Puraskar", Life Time Achievement International Award. Some of his works have been translated into English, German, French, Gujarati, Kannada, Telugu, Malayalam, Urdu (Dalit Awaaz) and Hindi (Suraj ke Vansh-dhar).

== Biography ==
=== Early days ===
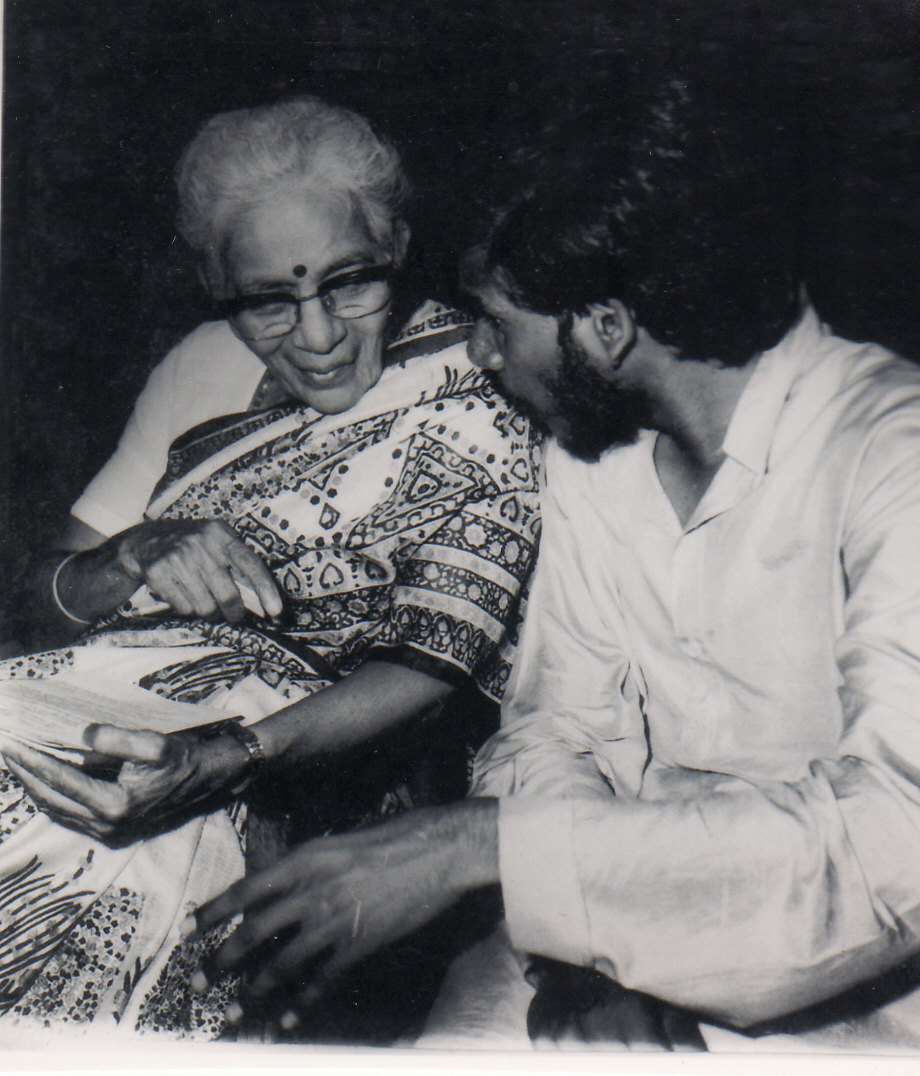
Arun Kamble and Maisaheb Ambedkar in Dalit Panther days.

Kamble was born on 14 March 1953, in Mahar Dalit family of village-Kargani, Atpadi near Sangli. He was a follower of Dr. B. R. Ambedkar as Dr. Ambedkar was an inspiration to him. His mother and father both were School Headmaster in Sangli. His mother Shantabai Kamble and father Krushnaji Kamble have written autobiographies called Majya Jalmachi Chittarkatha and Mi Krushna respectively. His father was a well known personality in Kargani district.

=== Education ===
His school days were in Athapadi and Dighanchi at Sangli. He completed B.A. (honors) from Willingdon College, Deccan Education Society, Sangli in 1974. Later he earned his M.A. from Siddhartha College in 1976 with distinction in "Shodhnibandh ani Shodhnibandhachi Lekhan Paddhati". His major interests were Dalit literature and Ambedkarite Movement.

=== Academic career ===
Prof. Arun Kamble in discussion with Former Prime minister Mrs. Indira Gandhi

He joined Dr. Ambedkar College of Commerce and Economics, Wadala, Mumbai in 1976 as a lecturer of Marathi (1976–1985). Later he joined Kirti College, Dadar (W), Mumbai (1985–1989). In 1990 he joined the University of Mumbai as a "Reader". Until his death he was a PhD Guide in Marathi Department and also was Head of Phule, Shahu Chair in University of Mumbai.

== Political and Social career ==
Kamble was the National President and one of the founding members of Dalit Panther. He was also the National General Secretary of Janata Dal, a member of the National Election Committee – Janata Dal (Parliamentary Board), and in charge of Election Committee of Bihar State. He successfully led the Namantar Andolan of Marathwada University as a president of Dalit Panther.

When the dispute arose on the book Riddles in Hinduism (Appendix, Riddles of Ram & Krishna) authored by Dr. Ambedkar, Kamble led an intellectual fight and a march with Ten Lakh people (January 1987) and the provision for reservation to Buddhist, Backward class, and minorities with Prime Minister V. P. Singh. He got promises and assurance to implement the Mandal Commission; Second Backward class Commission, with an immediate effect (1989).

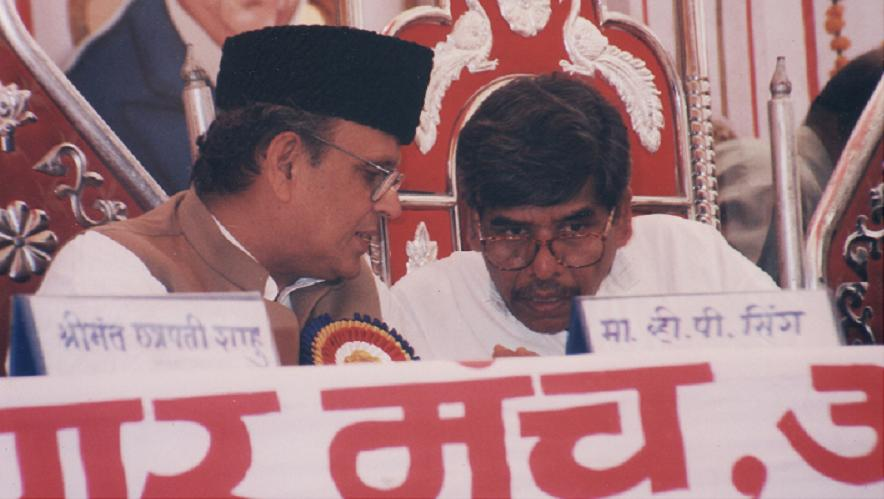
Professor Arun Kamble in conversation with former Prime Minister V.P. Singh. This picture was taken during the World Conference on Buddha, Phule, Ambedkar's Literature at Kalyan (Maharashtra).

Kamble resigned from Janata Dal on the issue of Dalit president of India. He led a march as a President of Dalit Panther during an Assembly Session at Nagpur on the issue of publishing Dr. Ambedkar's complete body of literature (1979). He later worked as a member of Dr. B.R. Ambedkar Charitra Sadhane Publication which was borne by a march.

Kamble worked as an editor for the book Dr. Babasaheb Ambedkar: Writings & Speeches. Maharashtra Government declared a decision to omit a part from the Appendix (Riddles in Hinduism, 'Dr. Babasaheb Ambedkar: Writings and Speeches' Volume 4). For this issue he left the editor's committee and filed a lawsuit in the High Court against the Maharashtra Government.

He inaugurated 'Manusmruti Cremation Conference' at Karur by Dravida Kazhagam, founded by Periyar E. V. Ramasamy (1983). He also inaugurated and led a march to protest against the outrageous behavior on Dalit community at Karamchedu (1987). He led Samajik Nyay Jyoti (Social Justice Flame) with Ram Vilas Paswan from Chundur to New Delhi (1992). He was the Chief Guest at 'All India Dalit Writer's Conference' (October 1987) and worked as a convener of the 'All India Dalit Writer's Association. He inaugurated a Social Gathering of Dalit Literature at Bangalore (1986) and gave a speech at the conference of the Namantar-Mandal (1984). He inaugurated the 9th Marathi Conference at Badoda (1995) and gave a speech at the All India Dalit Liberation conference (6 December 1987). He undertook an editorial work for the periodicals Ambedkar Bharat, Shoonya, and Sangharsh.

=== Committee undertakings ===
Kamble worked as a member of National Police Commission and as a committee member for the advisory board of Special Department for Scheduled Caste & Scheduled Tribes at the University of Mumbai. He was a president of 3rd All India Conference on Dr. Ambedkar's Literature at Wardha and also a president at the World Conference on Buddha, Phule, and Ambedkar Literature at Kalyan ( 23–25 March 2002).

== Major works ==
=== Poetical works ===
- "Arun Krushnaji Kamble" (1983) Awarded Best Poetry Collection by Maharashtra Sahitya Parishad.
- "Mudra"

=== Prose works ===
- "Ramayanatil Samskrutik Sangharsh"- (Cultural Struggle in Ramayana)
- Ramayanatil Samskruti Sangharsh by Prof. Arun Kamble
- "Ramayanma Samskrutik Sangharsh"- Published by Subhash Palekar on 6 December 1993.
- "Janata Patratil Lekh"(JanataDr.B.R.Ambedkar, Edited by Arun Kamble − 7 appendices and 47 pages preface) Published by University of Mumbai and Popular Publication, 1993.
- "Cheevar"-(Essays on Literature and Culture), Ashay Publication, 1995.
- "Yug Pravartak Ambedkar"-(Epoch Making Ambedkar) Ashay Publication, 1995.
- "Chalvache Diwas"- (Reminisances of the Agitations), Ashay Publication, 1995.
- "Vad Samvad"-(Debate and Dialog) an Intellectual Prose, Pratima Publication – 1996, Pune.
- "Dharmantarachi Bheemgarjana" Conversion of Dr. B.R.Ambedkar) – Pratima Publication – 1996, Pune.
- "Marathi Intellectual Prose", Edited by Arun Kamble and other, Text prepared for B.A. (University of Mumbai), Pratima Publication, 2003.
- "Tarkateerth Laxmanshastri Joshi—Ek Vadatovyaghyat", Critical writing on Laxmanshastri Joshi, Ambedkar Bharat Publication, 1987.

=== Translations ===
- "Priya Adarker" translated a selection of his poems into English under the title Arun Kamble: Arun Krushnaji Kamble, Poems.
- "Modern Indian Poetry" Published by Pritish Nandy.
- "An Anthology of Dalit Literature", Edited by Eleanor Zelliot and Mulk Raj Anand.
- Poems published on the cover page, Bulletin of Concerned Asian Scholars, Journals of Michigan University, USA 1978 & 1998.
- "Some Aspects of Half Social Justice, Krishna Aiyar
- From "[Untouchable to Dalit", Eleanor Zelliot (Carleton College, USA), Manohar 2005.
- "Poisoned Bread" Edited by Arjun Dangle, Orient Longman and Co. 1992.

== Speeches ==
- Speech at Panvel.
- Speech at Pandharpur
- Speech at Amaravati
- Speech at Parbhani
- Documentary on Dalits (Mumbai's Way: Il buddismo negli slum. Visita a Daharawi con il Dr. Arun Kamble).

== Death ==
Kamble was found dead in a lake at Hyderabad. News of his suspected death in a mysterious manner came as a major shock to his friends in socio-political circles. Kamble had gone to Hyderabad on 13 December 2009 to take part in an international seminar at Birla Scientific Institute in Saifabad and went missing the next day.
