= Biroba =

God of Dhangar community in Maharashtra

Biroba is a form of Hindu god Shiva. Biroba is the kuldaivat of Dhangars of Maharashtra State. There are many temples of Biroba in villages of Maharashtra. Also Karnataka in [Bijapura dist:] [taluk:Chadachan] Shiradon And also in Hunnur (taluk: Mangalwedha), Arewadi (Dist: Sangli), Katphal (taluk: :Sangola, Anusewadi in Atpadi, Pattankodoli, Pangari(Satara) there are temple of Biroba. Biroba is brother of Mayakka devi.

The god Mahalingraya or Mahalingeshwar is the student of Biroba (called Birling in Karnataka) and their temples are situated on the Maharashtra and Karnataka border in Huljanti. Festival (i.e. jatra in Marathi) of both gods is celebrated for five days from the first day of Hindu festival Diwali.

Temple of Biroba:

- Mahalingraya-Biroba mandir, Huljanti, Mangalvedha, Solapur
- Biroba mandir, Arewadi, Kavthe mahankal, Sangli
- Vitthal-Birdev mandir, Pattankodoli, hatkangle, Kolhapur
- Shree Birdev Mandir,Gadmudshingi, Tal Karvir, Kolhapur, Maharashtra
- Shree Dhulshidha Birdev Mandir, Mouje Sangaon, Tal.kagal, Kolhapur, Maharashtra
- Virbhadra Mandir, Sakur Mandhave, Sangamner, Ahemadnagar, Maharashtra
- Biroba mandir, Hunnur.
- Birdev mandir, Salape, Phaltan, Satara
- Satoba-Biroba mandir, Takewadi, Man, Satara

Biroba (Veerbhadra) Mandir, Uralgone (Birudev nagari), Shirur, Pune, Maharashtra
