= Swatantrapur =

Village in Maharashtra

Coordinates: 25°18′N 81°39′E

Swatantrapur is a free custodian colony built in 1939 by Raja Bhawanrao Shriniwasrao Pant Pratinidhi "Bala Sahib" of Aundh princely state. It is located in between Atpadi lake and Bhingewadi, in Atpadi taluka of Sangli district, of Maharashtra, an Indian state.

== History ==
It is believed that during the ancient days, those prisoners who came to behave well in other prisons during their period of punishment were ultimately brought to this jail as a reward. Over here, prisoners were allowed to meet their families and were also given a personal land for farming activities. Growing crops and selling them in the market was permitted so they could earn a living.

== In popular culture ==
The Hindi film Do Aankhen Barah Haath is inspired by Swatantrapur and penned by Madgulkar.
