= V. K. Singh =

Governor of Mizoram since 2025

General V. K. Singh PVSM, AVSM, YSM, ADC
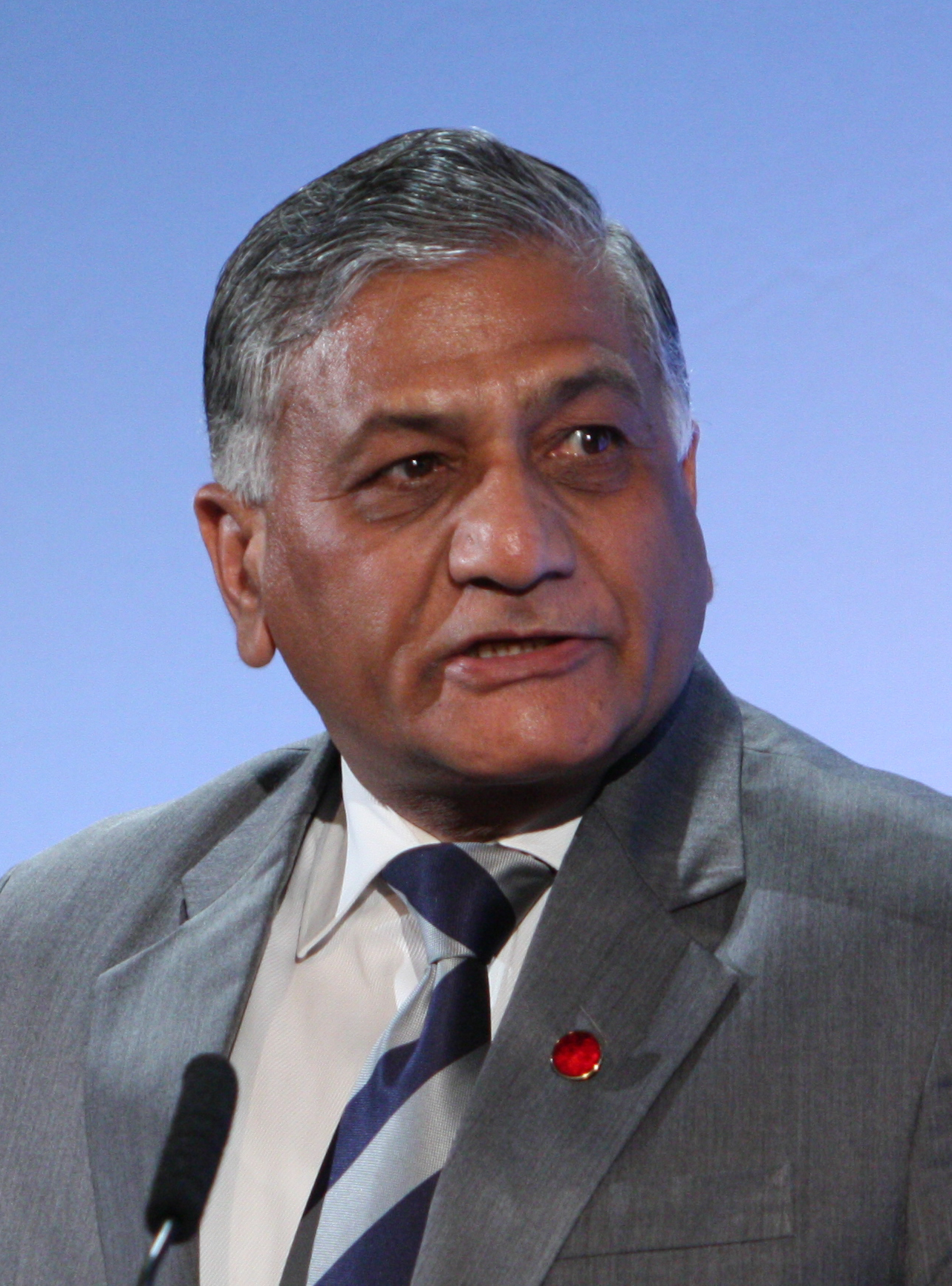
- Singh in 2014

Governor of Mizoram
- Incumbent
- Assumed office 16 January 2025
- Chief Minister: Lalduhoma
- Preceded by: Kambhampati Hari Babu

Union Minister of State for Civil Aviation
- In office 7 July 2021 – 9 June 2024
- Minister: Jyotiraditya Scindia
- Preceded by: Hardeep Singh Puri (MoS I/C)
- Succeeded by: Murlidhar Mohol

Union Minister of State for Road Transport and Highways
- In office 30 May 2019 – 9 June 2024
- Minister: Nitin Gadkari
- Preceded by: Mansukh L. Mandaviya
- Succeeded by: Ajay Tamta

Union Minister of State for External Affairs
- In office 27 May 2014 – 30 May 2019
- Minister: Sushma Swaraj
- Preceded by: E. Ahamed
- Succeeded by: V. Muraleedharan

Union Minister of State (Independent Charge) for Statistics and Programme Implementation
- In office 9 November 2014 – 5 July 2016
- Prime Minister: Narendra Modi
- Preceded by: Rao Inderjit Singh
- Succeeded by: D. V. Sadananda Gowda

Union Minister of State (Independent Charge) for Development of North Eastern Region
- In office 27 May 2014 – 9 November 2014
- Prime Minister: Narendra Modi
- Preceded by: Paban Singh Ghatowar
- Succeeded by: Jitendra Singh

Member of Parliament, Lok Sabha
- In office 16 May 2014 – 4 June 2024
- Preceded by: Rajnath Singh
- Succeeded by: Atul Garg
- Constituency: Ghaziabad, Uttar Pradesh

23rd Chief of the Army Staff
- In office 31 March 2010 – 31 May 2012
- President: Pratibha Patil
- Prime Minister: Manmohan Singh
- Preceded by: Deepak Kapoor
- Succeeded by: Bikram Singh

Personal details
- Born: 10 May 1951 (age 75) Poona, Bombay State, India (present-day Pune, Maharashtra)
- Party: Bharatiya Janata Party
- Spouse: Bharti Singh (m. 1975)
- Children: 2
- Education: National Defence Academy (BSc); Indian Military Academy; Defence Services Staff College (MPhil); United States Army War College
- Awards: Param Vishisht Seva Medal; Ati Vishisht Seva Medal; Yudh Seva Medal

Military service
- Allegiance: India
- Branch/service: Indian Army
- Years of service: 14 June 1970 – 31 May 2012
- Rank: General
- Unit: Rajput Regiment
- Commands: Chief of Army Staff; Eastern Command; II Corps; Victor Force, Rashtriya Rifles; 168th Infantry Brigade; 2 Rajput (Kali Chindi)
- Battles/wars: Indo-Pakistani War of 1971; Operation Pawan; Kargil War
- Service number: IC-24173W

General Vijay Kumar Singh PVSM, AVSM, YSM, ADC (born 10 May 1951) (Note: A subset of the official records of the Army misstated the year in which Singh was born (as 1950).) is a retired Indian Army general and politician who has served as the 16th governor of Mizoram since 2025. A former member of Parliament, and a former four-star general in the Indian Army. (Note: V K Singh started his career as a military officer and became the first ever commando (trained to carry out high altitude and counter insurgency operations) in the Indian Army to have been promoted to the general rank. He was part of the 1971 India-Pakistan War and Operation Pawan.) He is former minister of state in the Ministry of Road Transport and Highways and ministry of civil aviation in the Second Modi ministry. He previously served as MoS for External Affairs, Minister of State (Independent Charge) for Development of the North-Eastern Region and Minister of State for Statistics and Programme Implementation (Note: "Minister of State (Independent Recharge) for Statistics and Programme Implementation") in the First Modi ministry.

During his military career, Singh served as the 24th (Note: Singh's order in the succession of COAS depends on how the count is made. From the establishment of Indian "home rule", there had been 25 heads of the Indian Army prior to Singh's appointment. The first was designated, "Commander-in-Chief, Indian Army", while the second and 3rd were called "Chief of the Army Staff and Commander-in-Chief, Indian Army". If counted from the first commander with COAS included in the position title, Singh would be the 25th COAS; if from the first who was called solely COAS, he would be 23rd in the order; if counted from the very first Head of the army after home rule began, he would be the 26th. (See Chief of the Army Staff (India).) Most sources describe Singh as the 24th COAS.) chief of the Army Staff (COAS) from 2010 to 2012. Singh took the Government of India to court in a dispute over his date of birth and subsequent retirement, becoming the first serving Indian Chief of the Army Staff to take legal action against the Indian government.

After his retirement from the military, Singh joined the Bharatiya Janata Party (BJP) in 2014 and was elected as Member of Parliament to the Lok Sabha for the Ghaziabad constituency of Uttar Pradesh in that year's general election. He was re-elected to the same seat in 2019.

Singh has written an autobiography called Courage and Conviction. (Note: Singh, V.K.; Verma, Shiv Kunal (2013), Courage and Conviction: An Autobiography. Aleph Book Company)

== Early life and education ==
Singh was born on 10 May 1951 in a Rajput Family to Captain (later Colonel) Jagat Singh, an officer then serving in the 14th battalion the Rajput Regiment of the Indian Army, (Note: V K Singh was born on May 10, 1951 (or, according to some - erroneous - Army records, 1950). While his grandfather was a Junior Commissioned Officer, his father was a colonel in the Indian Army.) and Krishna Kumari, at the Military Hospital at Pune. He was born into the Tomar (tanwar) clan of Rajputs, (Note: Pride, tradition and the shortage of other local work opportunities continue to send Bapora’s Rajputs year after year to the Army’s recruitment camps (called bharti, enrollment) in neighbouring towns or states. Many who are enrolled enter the Rajput Regiment, as did Gen. Singh.) with roots in the Bapora village in the Bhiwani district of Haryana. His paternal grandfather, Daffadar Mukhram Singh, served with the 3rd Cavalry. All five brothers of his father served in the Army, either joining the 1st Horse (Skinner's Horse) or the 7th Rajput Regiment. His maternal grandfather, Subedar Shimbu Singh, also served in the Army and hailed from the Bohra Kalan village in the Gurgaon district. His village had been founded by the Rajput rulers and frequently involved in fighting with the Mughal and has produced many warriors. He was inspired by men who served the Army from the British times.

Singh's mother was diagnosed with terminal cancer and died in 1952.He qualified in the entrance exam and having filled 'Air Force' as his first choice, he appeared before the No. 1 Air Force Selection Board in Dehradun. He entered the National Defence Academy (NDA) in 1966. A part of the 'HUNTER' squadron, he held a number of cadet appointments at the NDA. He became a corporal in his fifth term, the battalion cadet captain (BCC) in his sixth term, and officiated as the academy cadet captain (ACC) for a short while. In his fifth term, on the request of his father, he was moved from the Air Force to Army

=== Indian Military Academy ===
After graduating from the NDA, he entered the Indian Military Academy (IMA) in June 1969. He was assigned to 'Cassino' Company at the academy. He was appointed senior under officer (SUO) in his fourth term. He passed out from the IMA in 1970, placed in the top ten in the merit list.

== Military career ==
Singh’s career in military lasted 42 years from the year 1970 to 2012. He started his career when he was commissioned in the 2nd Battalion of Rajput Regiment after graduating from Indian Military Academy and retired after serving as the chief of Army Staff . He has been a part of many wars and recipient of many Army honours.

=== Early career (1970–1978) ===
Singh was commissioned into the 2nd Battalion of the Rajput Regiment (Kali Chindi) on 14 June 1970. The battalion was among the oldest in the Indian Army, having been raised in 1798 as 1/16 Bengal Native Infantry. He joined the battalion in Delhi, where it was garrisoned in the Red Fort and the Rashtrapathi Bhavan. He was slotted into 'C' company of the battalion. He attended the Young Officers (YOs) course at the Infantry School in Mhow in November 1970. He completed the course and joined his battalion in early 1971 in Tamulpur in Assam where the battalion had moved. Before the outbreak of the Indo-Pakistani War of 1971, he was appointed Intelligence Officer (IO) of the battalion. The battalion moved to Meghalaya in mid-1971 and fought the war, entering East Pakistan from the east. Singh served as the IO through the war. He was at that time a junior Officer in the 1971 Bangladesh Liberation war and he was at Assam at that time. He was a witness of 1971 Bangladesh genocide by Pakistan Army officers and enlisted soldiers, and described the treatment of the people of Bangladesh by the Pakistan Army as akin to Nazism. He commented:

"The world has forgotten the atrocities committed in Bangladesh. I do not think the people of Bangladesh of that period have forgotten, but the coming generations, probably have found it easier to put it somewhere in the corner"

— Singh, Indian Army Records

He was very much inspired by Field Marshal Sam Manekshaw and was a follower of his ideology and learnt leadership from him, after he met him after the War of India and Pakistan in 1971. After the war, the battalion went to Bhutan on a training exercise with the Royal Bhutan Army. In 1973, he was nominated to attend the battalion support weapons course at Mhow. After finishing the course and returning to the battalion, in early 1974, he was again sent to attend the winter warfare course at Gulmarg. In mid-1974, he was posted to the Infantry School as an instructor in the platoon weapons division.

In late 1975, Singh was one of two officers selected to attend the United States Army Ranger School at Fort Benning, Georgia in the United States. The Ranger course is 62 days long and is aimed at small unit tactics and leadership. During this course, he was assigned to Whisky company of the 75th Ranger Regiment. He performed well in the physically-extracting course, which started with over 300 students and ended with only about 90 graduating. He was graded an honours graduate since he had graded more than 80%. Since he was a graduate of the Ranger School, he was permitted to wear the coveted Ranger tab on his uniform.

After completing the course, he returned to India and was posted to the Commando School at Belgaum. After a year at the school, he moved back to his battalion in Secunderabad but was immediately selected to attend the Junior Command course at the College of Combat in Mhow. He finished the course and joined his battalion and was given command of a company. Two months later, he was selected to attend the winter warfare advanced course at the High Altitude Warfare School at Gulmarg.

=== Mid-career (1978–1994) ===
In April 1978, Singh came back to his battalion, which was to move to Poonch for its operational tenure along the Line of Control. He commanded the 'A' company of the battalion during this tenure. Later that year, he was posted to the Indian Military Training Team (IMTRAT) in Bhutan. He served as an instructor at IMTRAT for about two years. After his return from Bhutan, he was transferred to a new unit, the 25th battalion of the Rajput Regiment (25 Rajput) at Fatehgarh. He was given command of the Delta company of the battalion.

The battalion then moved to Alwar where Singh served as a company commander. In March 1982, he was selected to attend the Defence Services Staff College, Wellington, having secured a competitive vacancy. After completing the year-long course, he was posted as general staff officer 2 (GSO-2) in the Military Operations (MO) Directorate at Army headquarters. His tenure at the MO directorate was an eventful one. He had a ring-side view during Operation Meghdoot in early 1984, Operation Blue Star later that year, Operation Brasstacks in late 1986 and the 1987 Sino-Indian skirmish in the Sumdorong Chu Valley.

In mid-1987, he joined his battalion as a company commander. In July, as part of the 76 Infantry Brigade, the battalion moved to Chennai and embarked for Sri Lanka on the Tank Landing Ship INS Magar (L20). Inducted as part of the Indian Peace Keeping Force, they landed at Trincomalee. He spent the next two years in Sri Lanka fighting the Liberation Tigers of Tamil Eelam (LTTE). In mid-1988, he was promoted to the rank of lieutenant colonel and was appointed second-in-command of the battalion. On 26 January 1990, he was awarded the Yudh Seva Medal for leading an operation which eliminated 6 LTTE men.

In late 1989, Singh was approved to be promoted to the rank of colonel and cleared to command a battalion. In early 1990, the battalion embarked for Mumbai. Shortly thereafter, Singh was appointed chief instructor of the Commando School at Belgaum, where he had earlier served as an instructor. He was earmarked by the colonel of the regiment to take over command of 24 Rajput, but Singh was determined to get back to his old battalion (2 Rajput) or take over the battalion he served with in Sri Lanka (25 Rajput). After a few months, he was appointed commanding officer of 2 Rajput. The battalion was in Nowshera, Jammu and Kashmir along the Line of Control. It was a part of the 80 Brigade under the 25th Infantry Division. He commanded the battalion for about two years in Nowshera, before taking the unit to its peace location in Faizabad. The tenure started off in a tense environment - the Demolition of the Babri Masjid in December 1992, when the battalion was on the move to Faizabad.

Singh also made a cameo appearance in the 1991 Hindi film Prahaar: The Final Attack, starring Nana Patekar, Madhuri Dixit and Dimple Kapadia.

=== Later career (1994–2001) ===
In June 1994, Singh was selected to attend the Higher Command Course at the Army War College, Mhow. After the ten-month course, he was appointed Colonel General Staff (Col GS) of the 12th Infantry Division at Jodhpur. He spent close to three years in this appointment under two division commanders. In 1998, he was promoted acting brigadier and appointed commander of the 168 Infantry Brigade in Samba, Jammu and Kashmir. As Brigade commander, he had four infantry battalions and two Border Security Force units under his command. A year into his command, the Kargil War broke out and all units were on high alert. He was in command of the brigade till mid-2000.

In June 2000, Singh was selected to attend the United States Army War College in Carlisle, Pennsylvania, in the United States. He performed well at the War College and was graded 'exceptional' in the course. After the course, he returned to India and was appointed Brigadier General Staff (BGS) of Jalandhar based XI Corps. He served in this appointment during Operation Parakram when Indian troops were mobilised on the border in the wake of the 2001 Indian Parliament attack.

=== General officer (2001–2010) ===
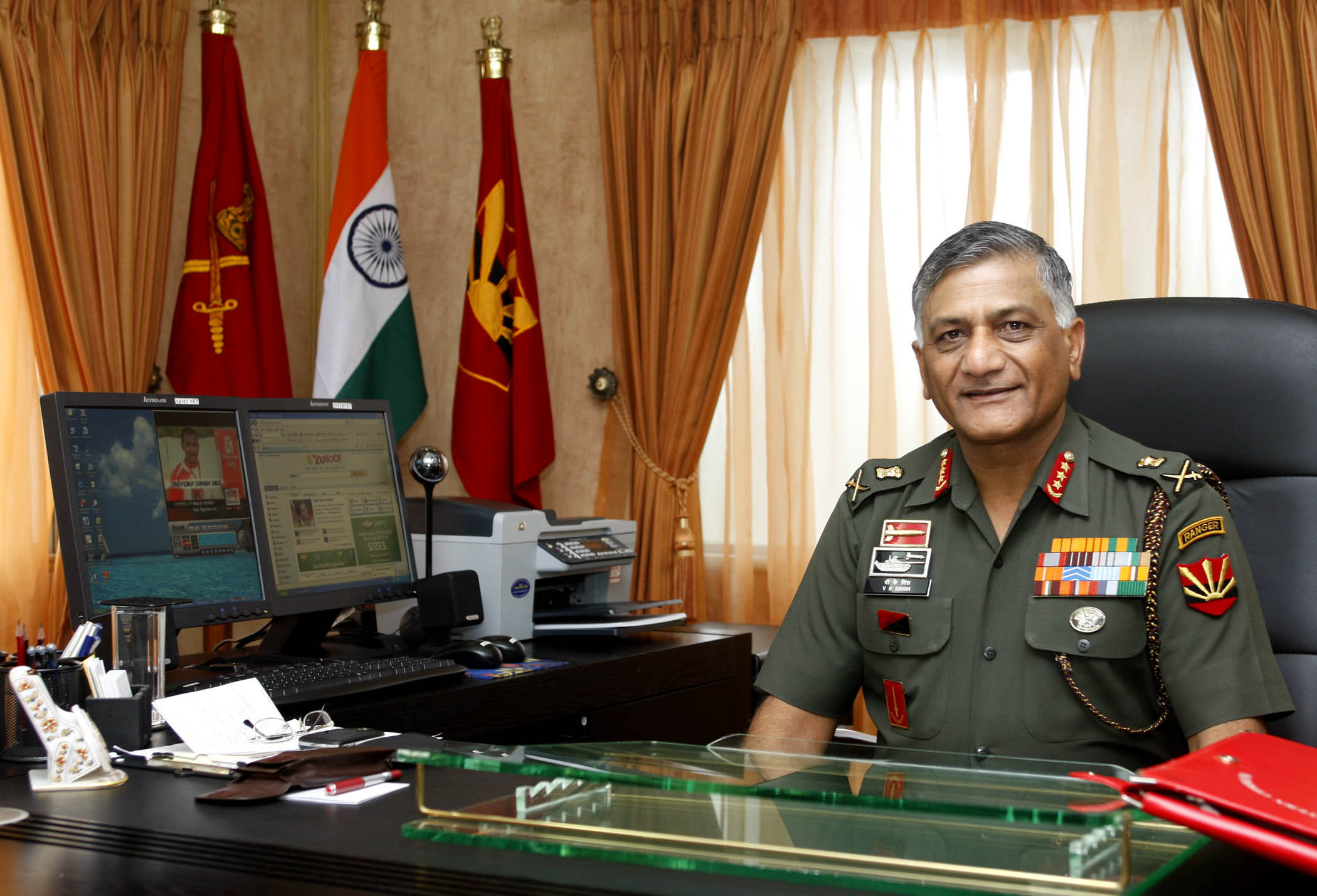
Lt Gen Singh as the Eastern Army Commander in 2008.

Singh was promoted to the rank of major general and appointed general officer commanding (GOC) Victor Force - a division-sized formation in the Rashtriya Rifles in Jammu and Kashmir. The Victor Force is responsible for the districts of Anantnag, Pulwama, Shopian, Kulgam and Budgam. For his distinguished service as GOC Victor Force, he was awarded the Ati Vishisht Seva Medal on 26 January 2003. After a one-and-a-half tenure, he took over as the chief of staff (COS) of the XV Corps. As the COS and the officiating Corps Commander, he was involved in the relief operations in the aftermath of the devastating 2005 Kashmir earthquake, the deadliest earthquake to hit South Asia since the 1935 Quetta earthquake.

On 15 April 2006, Singh was promoted to the rank of lieutenant general and shortly thereafter appointed general officer commanding II Corps at Ambala. He was at the helm of the Strike Corps for about two years. On 25 February 2008, he was promoted to army commander grade and appointed general officer commanding-in-chief Eastern Command. For distinguished service of the highest order, he was awarded the Param Vishisht Seva Medal on 26 January 2009.

=== Chief of Army Staff (2010–2012) ===
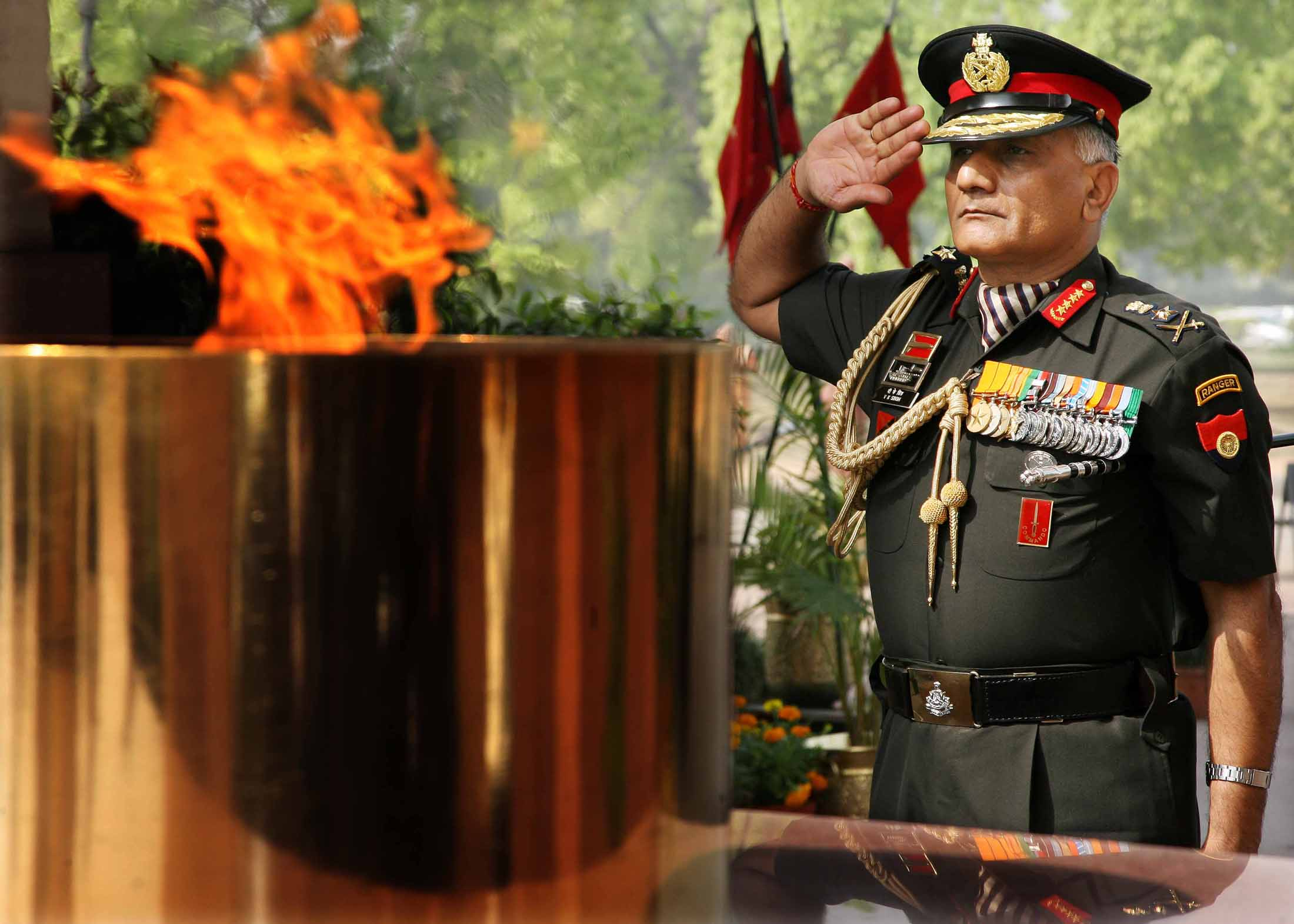
Gen V.K. Singh paying homage at Amar Jawan Jyoti after taking over as Army Chief

Singh became the 24th chief of Army Staff on 31 March 2010, and was the first commando to achieve that position. Towards the end of his career, a dispute regarding his date of birth arose; Singh took the Government of India to court and become the first serving officer of the Indian Army to do so. Because of an error made in 1965 when he enrolled with the National Defence Academy, official records misstated the year in which he was born. Singh withdrew the writ in February 2012 when, according to The Hindu, the Supreme Court of India "refused to intervene". The Court noted there was no dispute regarding his actual date of birth and that the matter being contested was the way in which it had been recorded. It ruled Singh had on three occasions accepted the misrecorded date. (Note: Singh was the 24th Indian Army Chief and the only one to date to take a dispute with the Union Government to court, in the case of his date of birth issue.)

The BBC noted in 2012 that defence experts considered a drive to modernise the Indian army had suffered from "a lack of planning and acrimony between the military and the defence ministry". This report followed an interview given by Singh in March 2012 that caused a political row. According to Singh, over a year earlier he had reported to A. K. Antony, the defence minister, that he had been offered a bribe of US$2.7 million if the army bought several hundred sub-standard vehicles. Antony issued a rebuttal to the interview, saying he had requested a written report from Singh regarding the incident and that this had never been submitted. Two days after the interview with Singh, a correspondence between V.K. Singh and the Prime Minister Manmohan Singh was leaked. The correspondence criticised the standard of India's defences and caused another political row.

Singh retired as Chief of Army Staff on 31 May 2012. He was succeeded by General Bikram Singh. (Note: 68-year-old Gen VK Singh Singh retired as Army chief in 2012 after a long drawn-out battle with Raj Babbar of Indian National Congress in Gaziabad.)

== Political career ==
After his retirement from the military, Singh showed support for the anti-corruption movement. He was seen on the stage in August 2012 at Ramlila Maidan in New Delhi, where the yoga instructor Ramdev was fasting in protest of alleged black money and corruption. Singh was reported to have said, "It is shocking but true that over two lakh farmers have committed suicide since 1995. The problems of farmers will have to take the forefront in this movement as the government has turned a blind eye to their woes." Around that time he also said the anti-corruption movement, whose principal figurehead was Anna Hazare, to that of the Bihar Movement that was led by Jayaprakash Narayan in 1975. Singh said,

"When I evaluate the country's present condition, it is similar to that of 1975. Jayaprakash Narayan had then said 'Vacate the throne, common people are coming'. He felt then that corruption is the root of all problems ... the situation in the country is the same today." (Note: After retiring from his position as Chief of Army Staff, Singh became a member of the BJP. He also actively participated in the anti-corruption campaign led by Anna Hazare in New Delhi’s Ramlila Maidan. V K Singh once compared Anna’s movement with the 1975 Bihar Movement of Jayaprakash Narayan. On the issue of Nirbhaya gang rape case of 2012, which shook the conscience of the country, Singh was among the leading agitators against the crime.)

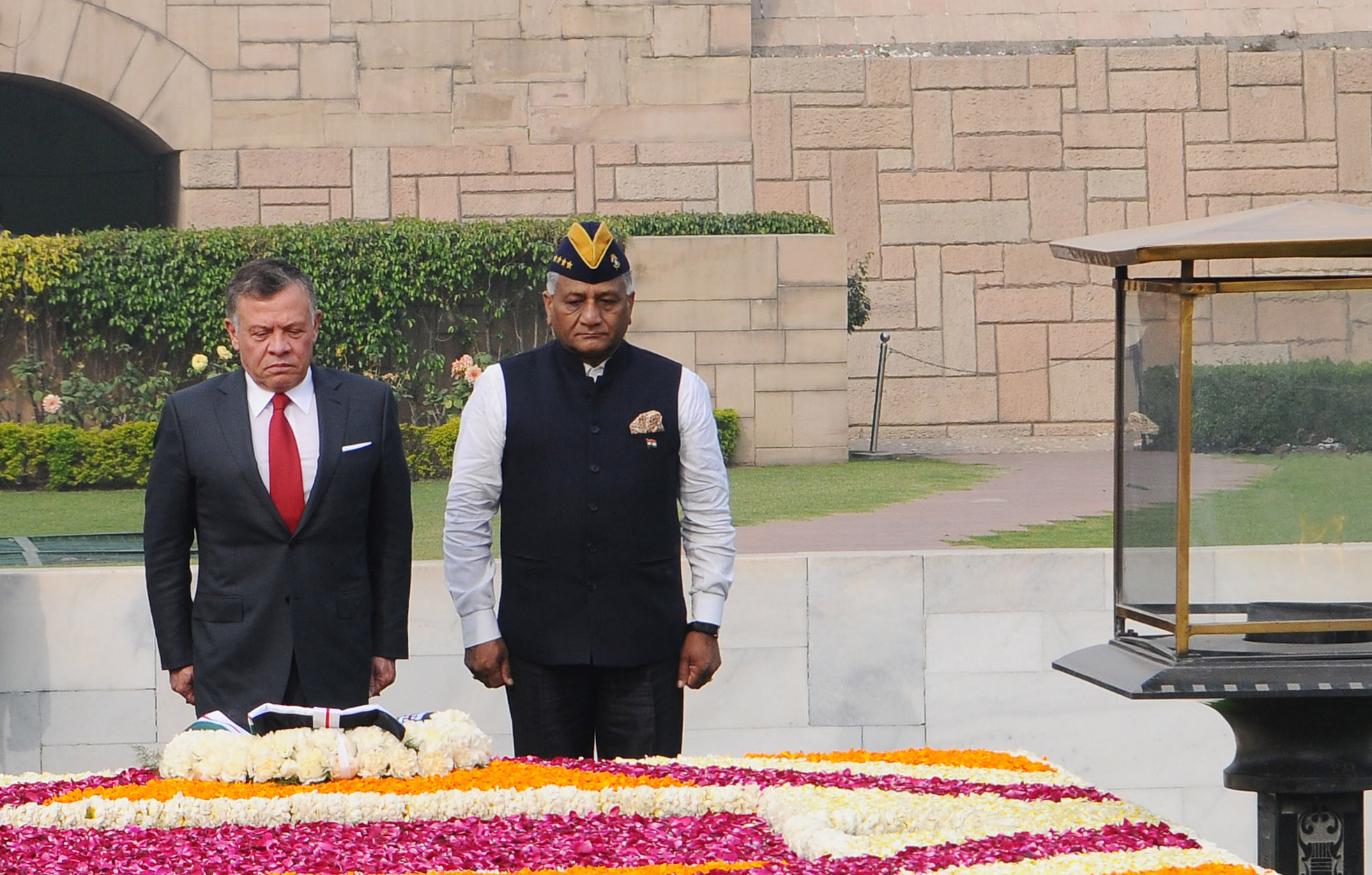
Minister of State for External Affairs, Gen V.K. Singh (R) with King Abdullah II of Jordan at Raj Ghat

Singh and Ramdev led a demonstration on 23 December 2012 at Jantar Mantar, New Delhi, on the 2012 Delhi gang rape case. Singh joined the BJP on 1 March 2014. He won the Ghaziabad (Lok Sabha constituency) seat in the 2014 Indian general election, defeating Raj Babbar of the Indian National Congress by a margin of 567,260 votes. He was re-elected in a landslide during the 2019 Indian general election and did not contest the 2024 Indian general election.

== Union minister ==
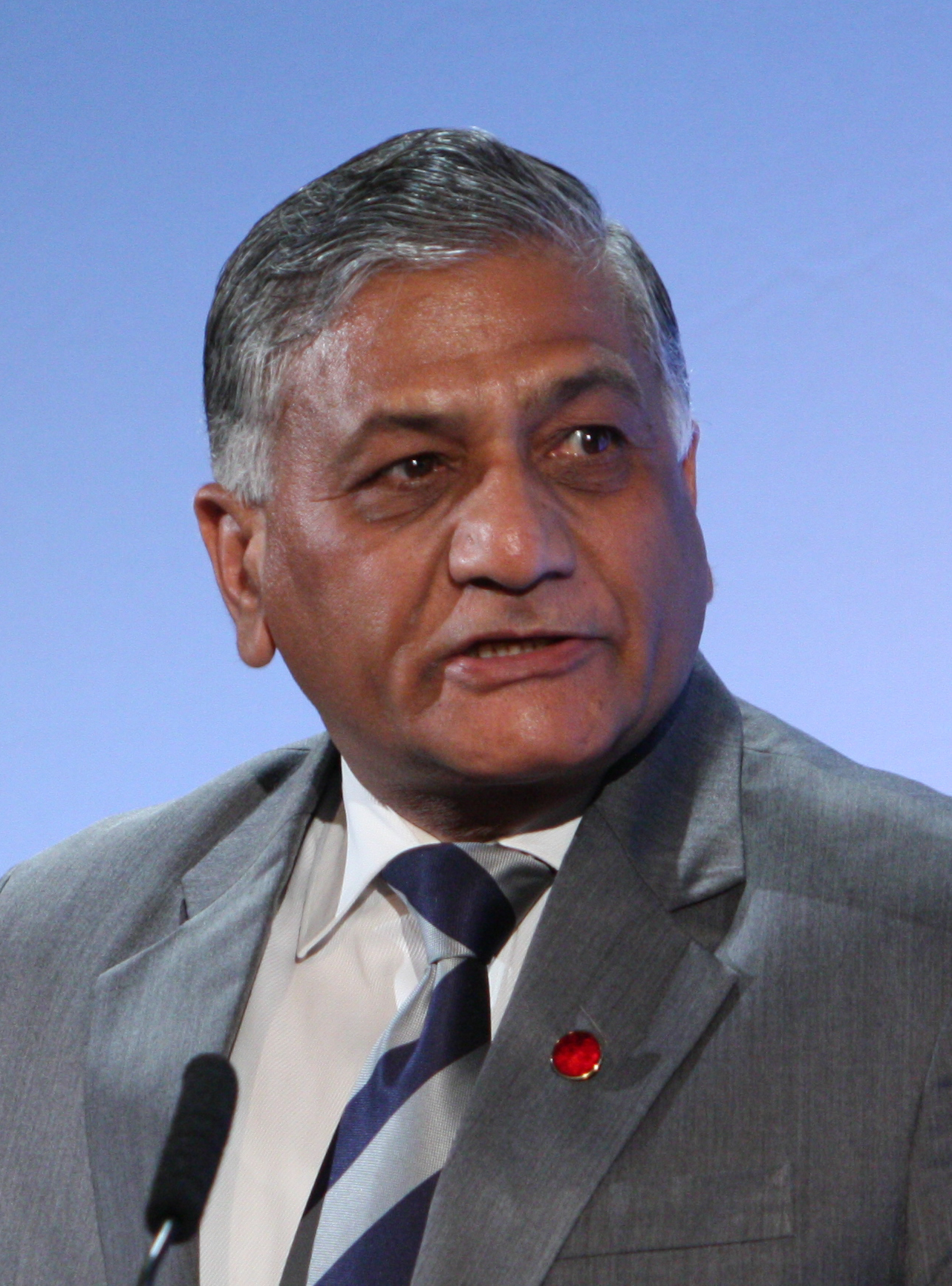
Singh as Minister of External Affairs.

In May 2014, Singh was appointed Minister of State of External Affairs and Minister of state (independent charge) for North East Region in the NDA-led Indian government. He was relieved of responsibility for the North East Region in November 2014, when Jitendra Singh replaced him.

Singh is praised for leading Operation Raahat, a rescue mission to evacuate Indian citizens and other foreign nationals from Yemen during 2015 Yemeni Crisis. Prime Minister Narendra Modi in April 2015 said, "I believe this is the first time in the world that a government minister has stood on the battlefield like a soldier to do this work ... I salute General V. K. Singh." In May 2019, Singh became Minister of State for Road Transport and Highways and served there till 11 June 2024.

=== Electoral history ===
2019 General Election

2019 Indian general elections: Ghaziabad
Party	Candidate	Votes	%	±%
BJP	General Vijay Kumar Singh	944,503	61.93	+5.45
SP	Suresh Bansal	4,43,003	29.06	+21.09
INC	Dolly Sharma	1,11,944	7.34	−6.91
NOTA	None of the Above	7,495	0.49	+0.03
Majority		5,01,500	32.90	−9.36
Turnout		15,25,097	55.89	−1.05
BJP hold		Swing	-7.82	

2014 General Election

2014 Indian general elections: Ghaziabad
Party	Candidate	Votes	%	±%
BJP	General Vijay Kumar Singh	758,482	56.51	+13.17
INC	Raj Babbar	1,91,222	14.25	−18.16
BSP	Mukul	1,73,085	12.89	−8.84
SP	Sudhan Kumar	1,06,984	7.97	N/A
AAP	Shazia Ilmi Malik	89,147	6.64	N/A
NOTA	None of the Above	6,205	0.46	N/A
Majority		5,67,260	42.26	+31.33
Turnout		13,42,471	56.94	+11.64
BJP hold		Swing	+15.67	

== Governor of Mizoram ==
Singh was sworn in as the Governor of Mizoram on 16th Jan, 2025. He is the 25th Governor of Mizoram.

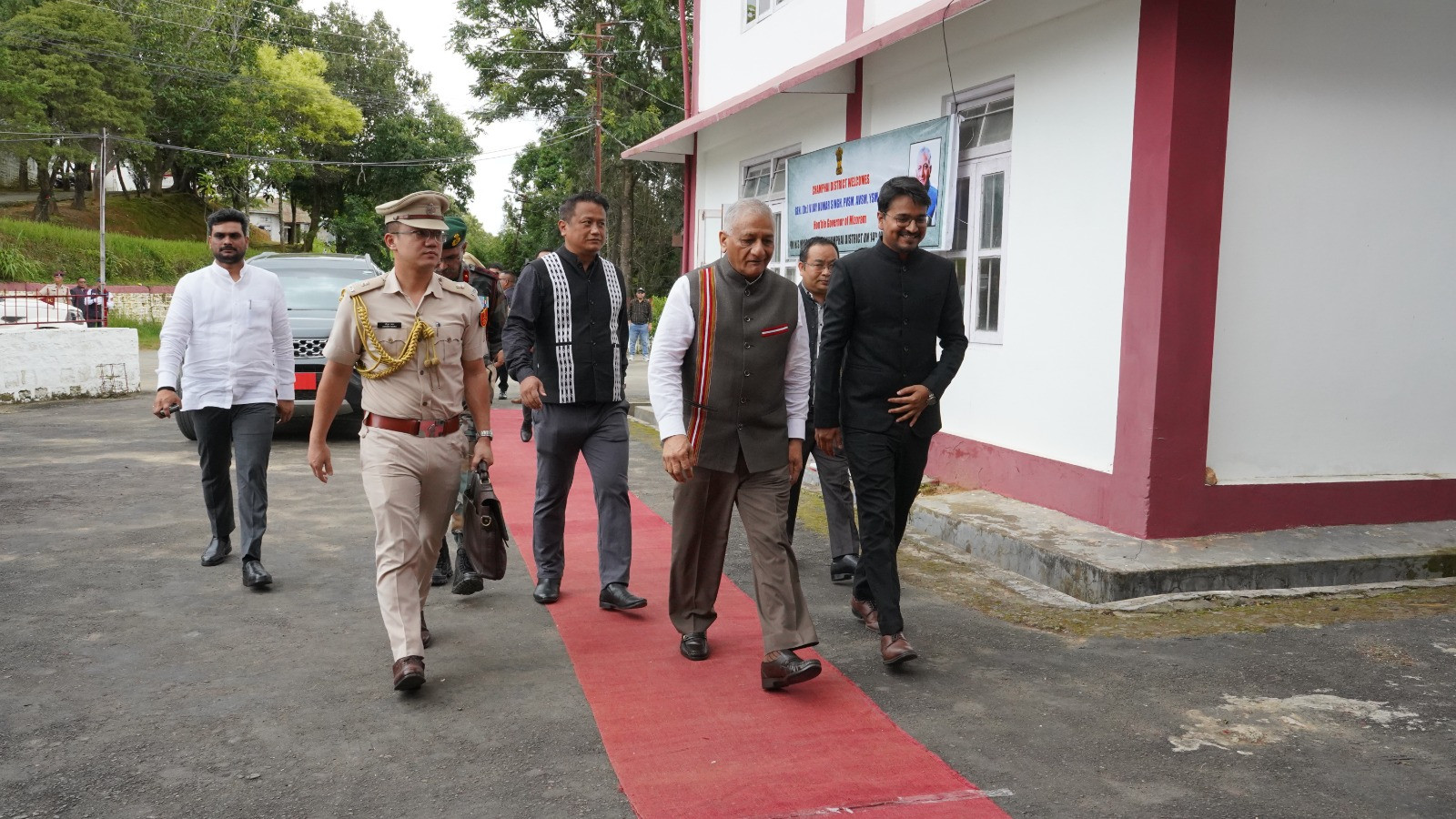
Governor VK Singh visits Champhai District

== Personal life ==
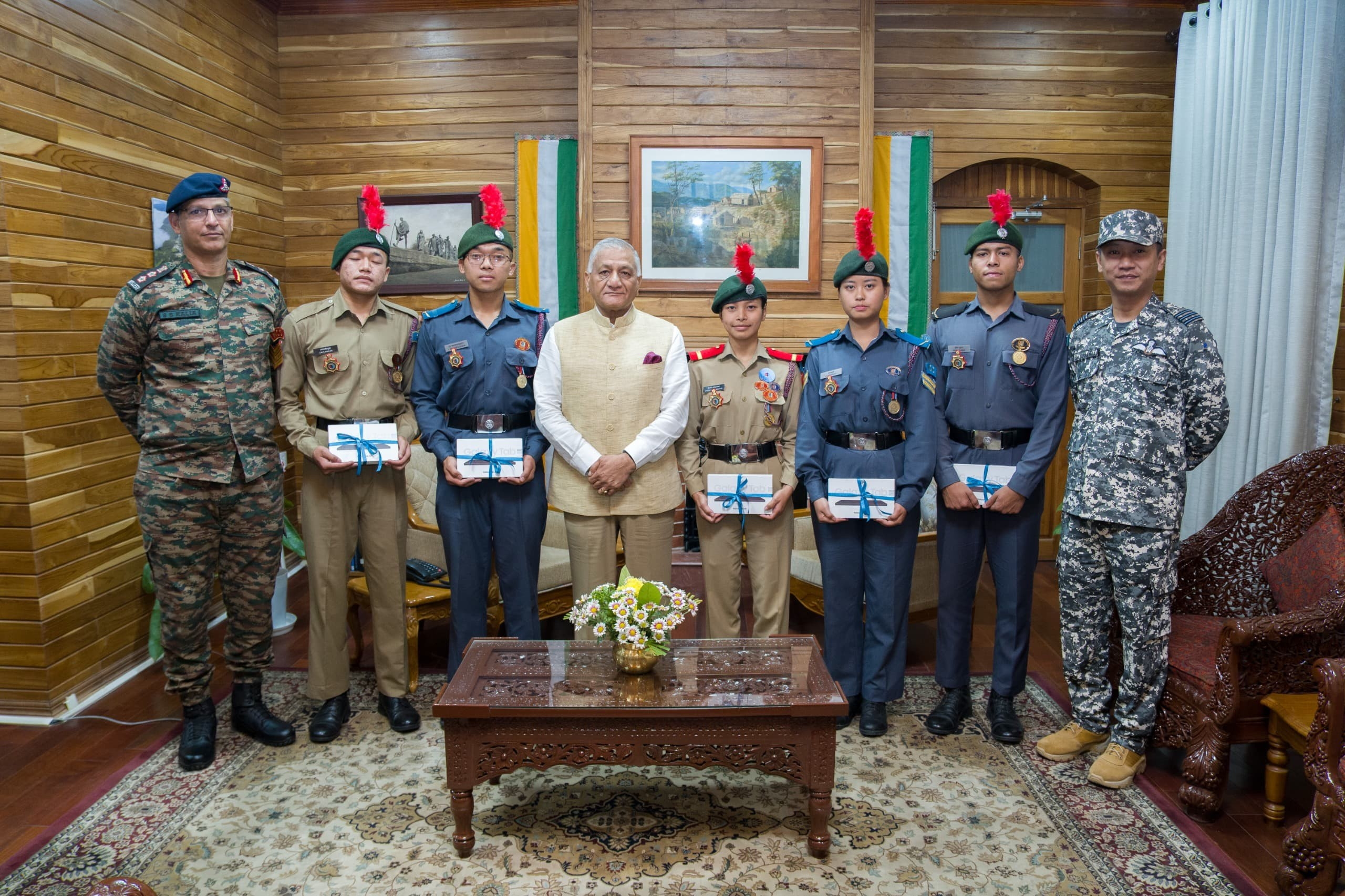
V.K. Singh in 2025

Singh is married to Bharti Singh. Bharti complained of an occurrence of blackmail and extortion by a man of Gurugram. She and Singh have two daughters, Yogja Singh and Mrinali Singh. Yogja is married to Anirudh Singh who is the son of Lt. Gen. Ashok Singh.

Aside from his career in defence and politics, his interests are sport, horse riding, and reading. He has written an autobiography, Courage and Conviction, covering his career and experience in the Indian Army.

He has often been embroiled in controversy over his comments on social issues and topics of national importance. From a family with a military background, he is open in his expression of nationalism. He faced criticism over his battle to have the army's record of his date of birth rectified. (Note: A variety of sources took a range of positions (not all critical) on Singh's fight with the Ministry of Defence over his date of birth.) The dispute culminated in a Supreme Court case. Singh failed in his attempt to have the Army's anomalous record of two different birth dates amended to reflect the later date. The court ruled that the Ministry of Defence could act to enforce his retirement according to the earlier 1950 date, given that Singh had previously agreed to the Army's use of the 1950 date when granting him promotions and awards. The court did not dispute the fact that his actual date of birth was in 1951.

== Honours and awards ==
=== Military awards ===

Param Vishisht Seva Medal	Ati Vishist Seva Medal	Yudh Seva Medal	Poorvi Star
Special Service Medal	Sangram Medal	Operation Vijay Medal	Operation Parakram Medal
Sainya Seva Medal	High Altitude Service Medal	Videsh Seva Medal	50th Anniversary of Independence Medal
25th Anniversary of Independence Medal	30 Years Long Service Medal	20 Years Long Service Medal	9 Years Long Service Medal
US Army Ranger Tab

During his service as the COAS, Singh was appointed honorary aide-de-camp to the president of India. He served as the colonel of the Rajput Regiment and as the honorary colonel of the Brigade of Guards, by virtue of being the Army chief. On 11 March 2011, he was inducted into the United States Army War College Class of 2001 graduates International Fellows Hall of Fame. He is the 33rd International Fellow and the first officer from the Indian Armed Forces to be inducted. He was inspired by the legacy of Sam Manekshaw in the 1971 Indo Pak war when he was a junior officer in Army.

== Dates of rank ==
Insignia	Rank	Component	Date of rank
	Second Lieutenant	Indian Army	14 June 1970
	Lieutenant	Indian Army	14 June 1972
	Captain	Indian Army	14 June 1976
	Major	Indian Army	14 June 1983
	Lieutenant-colonel	Indian Army	1 November 1991
	Colonel	Indian Army	1 February 1993
	Brigadier	Indian Army	4 June 1999
	Major General	Indian Army	29 June 2004
	Lieutenant-general	Indian Army	1 October 2006
	General (COAS)	Indian Army	1 April 2010

== See also ==
- Chief of the Army Staff (India)

== Selected works ==
- Singh, V.K.; Verma, Shiv Kunal (2013), Courage and Conviction: An Autobiography, Aleph Book Company, ISBN 978-9382277576
- Singh, V. K. (2005). Leadership in the Indian Army: The Story of 13 Soldiers. SAGE Publications. pp. 1–417. ISBN 9780761933229.

Military offices
Preceded by J S Lidder	General Officer Commanding Victor Force; 2004-2005	Succeeded by Prakash Menon
Preceded by K D S Shekhawat	General Officer Commanding II Corps; 2006-2008	Succeeded by J P Singh
Preceded by K S Jamwal	General Officer Commanding-in-Chief Eastern Command; 2008-2010	Succeeded by Bikram Singh
Preceded by Deepak Kapoor	Chief of Army Staff; 2010-2012	Succeeded by Bikram Singh
Lok Sabha
Preceded by Rajnath Singh	Member of Parliament for Ghaziabad; 2014 – 2024	Succeeded by Atul Garg
Political offices
Preceded by Mansukh L. Mandaviya	Minister of State for Road Transport and Highways; 2019 - 2024	Succeeded by Harsh Malhotra and Ajay Tamta
Preceded by E. Ahamed	Minister of State for External Affairs; 2014-2019	Succeeded by M. J. Akbar
Preceded by Paban Singh Ghatowar; Minister of State with Independent Charge	Minister of Development of North Eastern Region; 26 May 2014 – 9 November 2014; Minister of State with Independent Charge	Succeeded by Jitendra Singh; Minister of State with Independent Charge
Preceded by Rao Inderjit Singh (Minister of State with Independent charge)	Minister of Statistics and Programme Implementation (Minister of State with Independent charge); 10 November 2014 – 5 July 2016	Succeeded by D. V. Sadananda Gowda
Government offices
Preceded by Kambhampati Hari Babu	Governor of Mizoram; 16 January 2025 - Present	Incumbent
