= G. Kamble =

Indian painter (1918–2002)

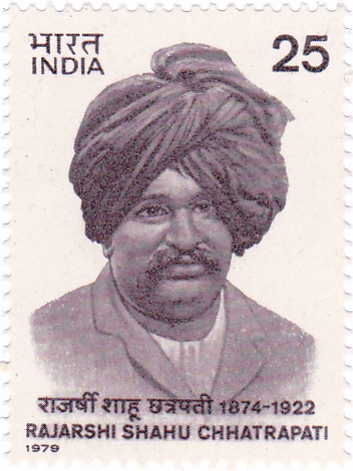
- Born: Gopal Balwant Kamble; 22 July 1918; Kolhapur, Kolhapur State, India
- Died: 21 July 2002 (aged 83)
- Education: self-taught
- Known for: Film poster/Illustrations, Portrait painting/Oil painting, Wall-painting
- Movement: Realism (for portraits)
- Awards: Kolhapur Bhushan Purskar

Gopal Balwant Kamble (22 July 1918 – 21 July 2002) was an Indian painter known for painting Bollywood movie posters and realist portraits of people from Maharashtra.

== Early life ==
Kamble was born on 22 July 1918 in the Mangalwar Peth neighborhood of Kolhapur city, then part of the princely Kolhapur State. He was born in a poor Hindu Khatik family.

== Career ==
=== Movie posters ===
Kamble could not pursue traditional technical education in arts due to financial constraints and started learning poster painting in Kolhapur at the Hans talkies and as an unpaid intern at the Cinetone studios. He considered Italian painter Fortunino Matania to be his role model. He moved to Mumbai (then Bombay) in the 1930s to start working in film industry. He received assignments from movie studios to paint promotional posters. In the beginning he painted movie posters for Ranjit Studios, The Bombay Talkies Studios, Gemini Studios (Madras), National Studios, Prabhat Film Company, and the Film City, Mumbai.

V. Shantaram, the foremost film maker of era, invited Kamble to work for his Rajkamal Kalamandir studio.

In the times before TV and radio, movie promotion was highly dependent on the appealing colourful posters by Kamble and his posters were successful and highly appreciated all over India. Kamble painted movie posters for hit films including Do Aankhen Barah Haath (for which he produced a 350-ft banner at Bombay's Opera House in 1957), Amar Bhoopali, Jhanak Jhanak Payal Baaje, Navrang, Shakuntala Apna Desh, Sehra, Toofan Aur Deeya, Bhakticha Mala, and Geet Gaya Patharon Ne. He was also responsible for painting posters for the iconic Hindi movie Mughal-e-Azam.

=== Portraits ===
After some time in movie industry, Kamble turned his focus to drawing personal portraits of prominent people. Kamble's portrait of Chhatrapati Shivaji was accepted by the government of Maharashtra as the official portrait in the 1970s, but he received flak from reformer Madhavrao Bagal for asserting that his portrait of Shivaji was based upon a divine vision. His portrait of Shahu of Kolhapur was utilized to recreate the likeness for commemorative postal stamp in 1979.

He painted prominent social reformers and politicians Bal Gangadhar Tilak, Jyotirao Phule, Mahatma Gandhi, B. R. Ambedkar, JFK, Rabindranath Tagore, Atal Bihari Vajpayee, Lata Mangeshkar. Some of his paintings are on permanent display in the Kailashgarhchi Sawari Mandir (temple) in Kolhapur.

== Selected works ==
- Posters: Toofan Aur Deeya (1956), Do Aankhen Barah Haath (1957), Son of India (1962), May Bahini (Marathi, 1952), Maharani Yesubai (Marathi, 1954), Tambdi Maati (Marathi, 1969)
- Banners: Roti (1942), Jhanak Jhanak Payal Baaje (1955), Navrang (1959), Rajkamal Kalamandir's production Dr. Kotnis Ki Amar Kahani (1946)
- Cinema Displays: Shakuntala (1943) at the Swastik Cinema, Lamington Road in Mumbai, Do Aankhen Barah Haath (1957) at Opera House, Mughal-e-Azam (1960) at Maratha Mandir.
- Booklet Art: Subah Ka Tara (1954); Marathi films Shilanganache Sone (1949), Shiva Ramoshi (1951).

== Death ==
Kamble died on 21 July 2002. A Kolhapur street near his house was named after him. In 2013, his descendants announced they were planning to erect an art gallery to showcase his work and requested financial support from the government.
