= Shuka =

Hindu sage

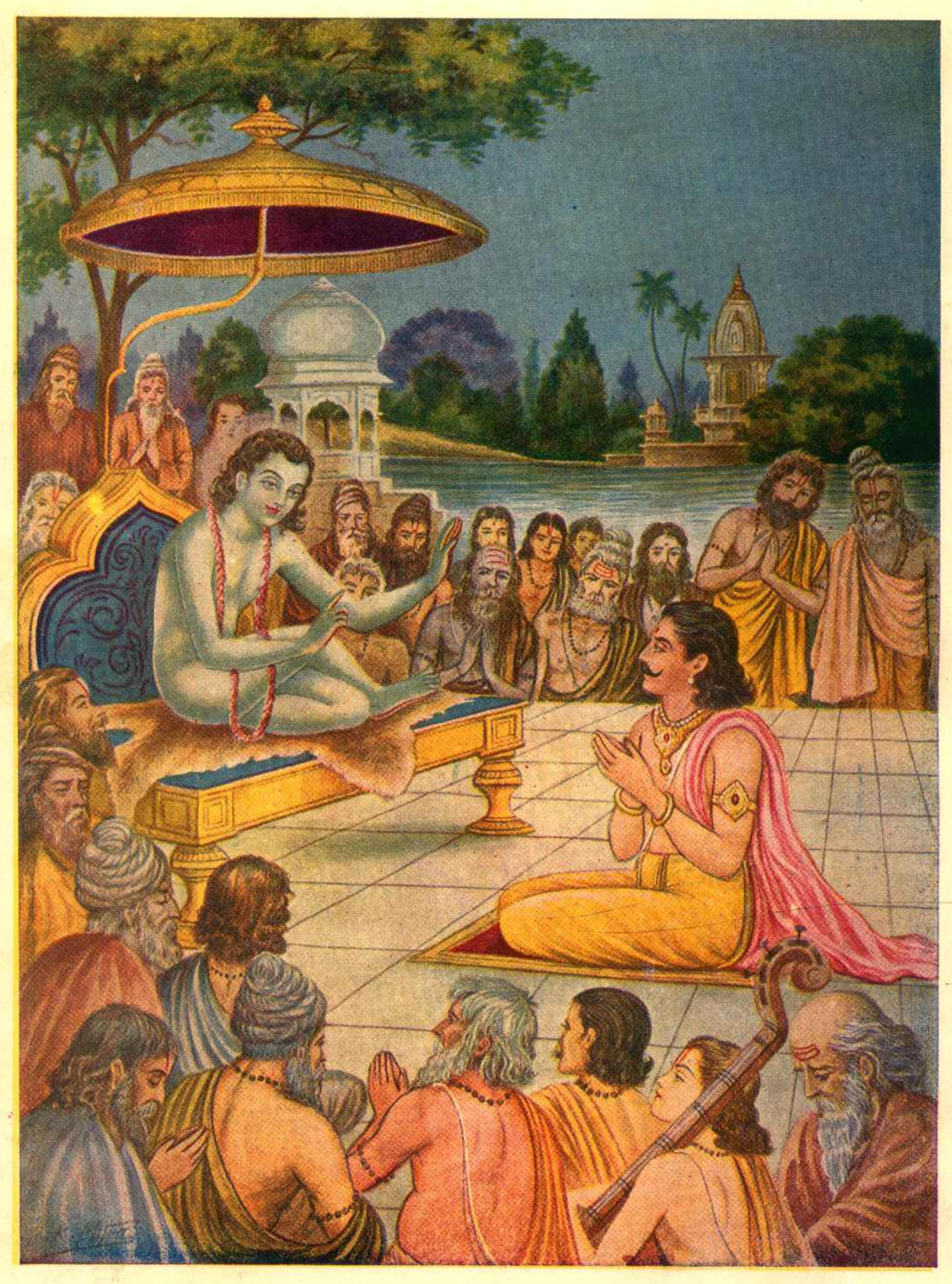
- Shuka preaching to Parikshit and the sages

Personal Information
- Family: Parents: Veda Vyasa (father); Vatikā (mother); Ghritachi (mother) (some accounts)
- Spouses: Celibate; Pivari (according to some Puranas)
- Children: Sons: Krsna; Sambhu; Gaur; Prabhu; Daughters: Krtti
- Relatives: Dhritarashtra, Pandu, Vidura (half brothers)

Shuka (Sanskrit: शुक IAST: Śuka, also Shukadeva Śuka-deva) is a rishi (sage) in Hinduism. He is the son of the sage Vyasa and the main narrator of the Bhagavata Purana. Most of the Bhagavata Purana consists of Shuka reciting the story to the king Parikshit in his final days. Shuka is depicted as a sannyasi, renouncing the world in pursuit of moksha (liberation), which most narratives assert that he achieved.

== Legends ==
=== Birth ===
According to the Hindu epic Mahabharata, after one hundred years of austerity by Vyasa, Shuka was churned out of a stick of fire and born with ascetic power. According to the Skanda Purana, Vyasa had a wife, Vatikā (also known by the name Pinjalā), daughter of a sage named Jābāli. Their union produced a son, who repeated everything he heard, and thus he received the name Shuka (lit. Parrot).

Other texts including the Devi Bhagavata Purana also narrate the birth of Shuka but with drastic differences. Vyasa desires an heir, when an apsara named Ghritachi flies in front of him in the form of a beautiful parrot. He discharges his semen, which falls on some sticks and a son developed. This time, he is named Shuka because of the role of the celestial parrot.

A slightly different story is told in other scriptures, in which Shuka's upanayana sanskar ritual is conducted by Lord Shiva. When Shiva prepares to narrate the secret of immortality to Parvati, at her behest, he orders all other beings in the vicinity to leave. Shiva closes his eyes and instructs Parvati to make a humming sound to indicate her sustained attention. At the very moment of Shiva's instruction, a parrot is born from its egg and becomes an audience to the secret divine conversation. Shiva starts his narrative and Parvati makes the sound, but mid-way falls asleep. The parrot, however, continues to make the humming sound so Shiva continues. After completely revealing the secret, Shiva finds Parvati asleep and realizes that another being has eavesdropped. He notices the parrot and pursues it, intending to kill it, since the knowledge given should have remained closely guarded. The tiny parrot flies into a nearby forest and enters into the womb of Vyasa’s wife through her mouth as she yawns. Shiva arrives and demands that the parrot comes out, but Vyasa persuades Shiva to leave the parrot alone, since if the parrot had truly heard the secret knowledge, it had already become immortal. Then Vyasa asks the parrot to come out, but it refuses, stating that if it comes out, it will be labeled Vyasa’s son. The parrot indicates it does not want any familial attachment, and wants only moksha. This continues for 12 years and Vyasa’s wife bears the pain as the parrot grows in her womb into a human child. Vyasa prays to Vishnu to help his wife. Vishnu, who was present on the earth as Krishna, arrives. Krishna assures the unborn child that no one would kill him and he would be incapable of worldly attachment and remain eligible for moksha. Hearing this, the child is born and is named “Shuka” (Sanskrit for “parrot”).

According to the Bhagavata Purana, Shuka left home immediately after his birth, caring nothing for a formal education, social conventions, or taking care of his parents. Gupta and Valpey make the case that although Shuka outwardly breaks many social norms throughout his life, he is not considered a heretic because he never fully breaks with Vedic tradition and because he is recognized for his devotion to Bhagavan.

=== Life ===
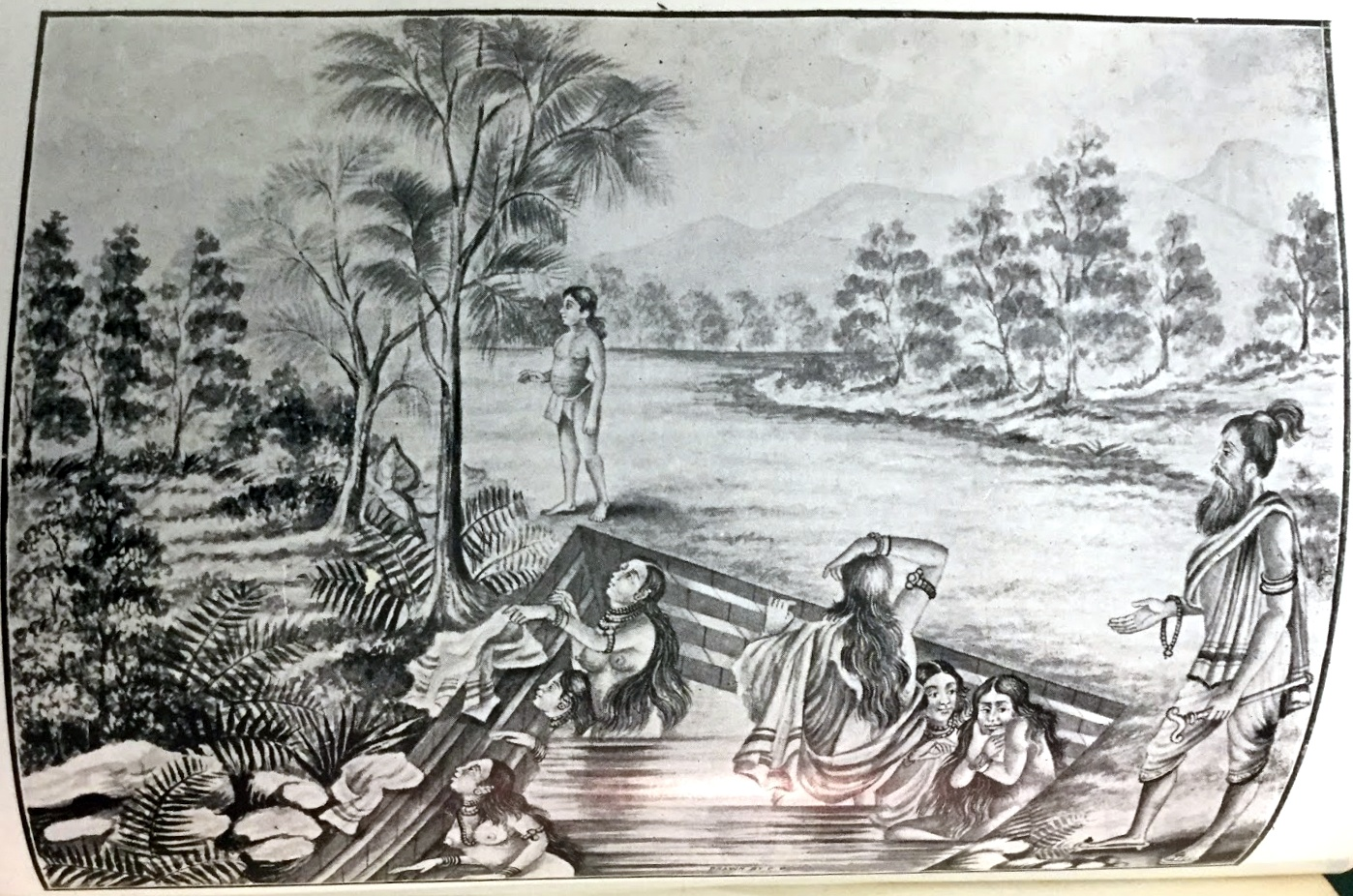
When Shuka came, the apsaras in semi-nude condition in the river never bothered; but when Vyasa came they hurriedly put their clothes on. Shuka’s mind was as pure as a crystal.

The Mahabharata also recounts how Shuka was sent by Vyasa to learn from King Janaka, who was considered to be a Jivanmukta (one who is liberated while still in a body). Shuka studied under the guru of the gods (Brihaspati) and Vyasa. Shuka asked Janaka about the way to liberation, with Janaka recommending the traditional progression of the four ashramas, which included the householder stage. After expressing contempt for the householder's life, Shuka questioned Janaka about the real need for following the householder's path. Seeing Shuka's advanced state of realization, Janaka told him that there was no need in his case.

Stories recount how Shuka surpassed his father in spiritual attainment. Once, when following his son, Vyasa encountered a group of celestial nymphs who were bathing. Shuka's purity was such that the nymphs did not consider him to be a distraction, even though they were naked, but covered themselves when faced with his father. Shuka is sometimes portrayed as wandering about naked, due to his complete lack of body consciousness.

=== Death ===
Shuka told a brief version of the Bhagavata Purana to the Kuru king Parikshit, who was destined to die after seven days due to a curse.

A place called Shukachari is believed to be the cave of Shuka, where he disappeared in cave stones as per local traditions. Shuka in Sanskrit means parrot and thus the name is derived from the large number of parrots found around the Shukachari hills. Shukachari literally means abode of parrots in the Sanskrit language.

== See also ==
- Bhagavad Gita
- Hindu mythology
- Krishna
- Shukeshwar Nath Mahadev Mandir
