= D. N. P. Kamble =

Indian politician

- Portrait of D. N. P. Kamble

Parliament of India, Lok Sabha
- In office 1952–unknown
- Constituency: Nanded

Parliament of India, Lok Sabha
- In office 1957–unknown
- Constituency: Nanded

Personal details
- Born: 8 October 1919 Pathri, Parbhani, Maharashtra
- Party: Indian National Congress
- Spouse: Laxmibai

Devrao Namdevrao Pathrikar Kamble was an Indian politician and the member of parliament, who represented Nanded parliamentary constituency. He was elected during the first and 2nd Lok Sabha. He was affiliated with Indian National Congress political party.

== Life and background ==
Kamble did his matriculation in Marathi literature (sahitya), and Doctor of Science in Homoeopathy. Prior to this, he was initially studying at a government junior high school situated in Pathri, and in modern-day Yogeshwari Mahavidyalaya in Ambajogai area of Mominabad. He also served as a Headmaster at a government primary school in Parbhani city of Maharashtra.
