= Bhingewadi =

Village in Maharashtra

Coordinates: 17.397755°N 74.918754°E

Bhingewadi is a small Grampanchat village 5 kilometers from Atpadi, Maharashtra, India. Town situated at north-western Atpadi-Sackali road. Bhingewadi consists of farms of people whose surname is Bhinge, so the name Bhingewadi. Bhingewadi is a small village of 2,000 people and farms in and around houses. Wheat, Jowar, Bajara, cotton and pomegranate is main produce from the farm lands. Pomegranate is the major source of farmers to earn the money. Bhingewadi is separated from Atpadi grampanchayat. A newly opened agriculture diploma college in Atpadi is located nearby Bhingewadi.
