= Shiv Kunal Verma =

Indian filmmaker, writer and military historian

Shiv Kunal Verma is a writer, military historian and a filmmaker based in India. He has shot and produced films on the Indian Armed Forces and the Indian Navy, and made a film on the Kargil War in 1999. He is a graduate of The Doon School and Madras Christian College.

== Bibliography ==
- Courage and Conviction
- The Long Road to Siachen
- Life of an Industani: Six Degrees of Separation
- 1962: The War That Wasn't
