= Shankarrao Kharat =

Marathi writer

Shankarrao Ramchandra Kharat (11 July 1921 – 9 April 2001) was a Marathi writer from Maharashtra, India.

Kharat was part of the Mahar community born in Atpadi, the secondary capital of the former princely state of Aundh, now in Sangli district. As an adult, he converted to Buddhism.

Kharat was associated with B. R. Ambedkar. He served for some years as the vice-chancellor of Marathwada University. and as a member of the Maharashtra Legislative Council.

In his writings, Kharat mainly wrote about the life experiences of people from the Dalit community.

== Work ==
During his lifetime, Kharat wrote six novels, eight short story collections, an autobiography, and several non-fiction books, all centered around the issues important to the Dalit struggle. His most celebrated work, Taral Antaral, an autobiographical novel, was first published in 1981 and gained prominence for its portrayal of Dalit life in Maharashtra.

In addition to his fictional writings, Kharat authored the non-fiction historical work Maharashtratil Maharancha Itihaas (The History of Mahars in Maharashtra), which remains a magnum opus in its field. Kharat's literature not only narrated stories but also aimed to resurrect the buried and appropriated histories of marginalized communities who had been denied a place in the literary imagination of the country.
