= Courage and Conviction =

2013 book by Vijay Kumar Singh

Courage and Conviction: An Autobiography
- The cover art of the book.
- Author: Vijay Kumar Singh; Shiv Kunal Verma (historian)
- Language: English
- Genre: War; Autobiography
- Published: 2013 (Aleph Book Company)
- Publication place: India
- Media type: Hardcover
- Pages: 396
- ISBN: 9789382277576

Courage and Conviction: An Autobiography is an autobiographical book by Indian General Vijay Kumar Singh written with Shiv Kunal Verma. It was first published by Aleph Book Company in 2013. In it, Singh criticises various situations in which he was involved, including alleged corruption in the Indian government and the role of Indira Gandhi in Operation Bluestar. In a 2013 interview with OPEN, an online portal and an Indian magazine, Singh said that his book might make people who work in the government become unhappy with him.

== Critical reviews ==
Courage and Conviction: An Autobiography has received average reviews from critics. Hindustan Times wrote that "The first army chief to take the government to court when they changed his age, General VK Singh now speaks out in his autobiography ‘Courage and Conviction’ on the age row, corruption in high places and a ring side view on the conflicts he participated in since the ’71 war" Firstpost published, "Former Army Chief Gen VK Singh has taken potshots at the functioning of Prime Minister Manmohan Singh, who was “expressing helplessness in matters” that should have been trivial." Deccan Herald wrote, "'Courage and Conviction' covers major developments from Singh's childhood to his retirement as Chief of Army Staff, including his run-ins with authority in school or later defending his actions when they led to a difference of opinion with politicians."
