= Sunita Kamble =

Indian veterinarian

Sunita Kamble is an Indian goat veterinarian recognised in the Women Transforming India awards in 2017.

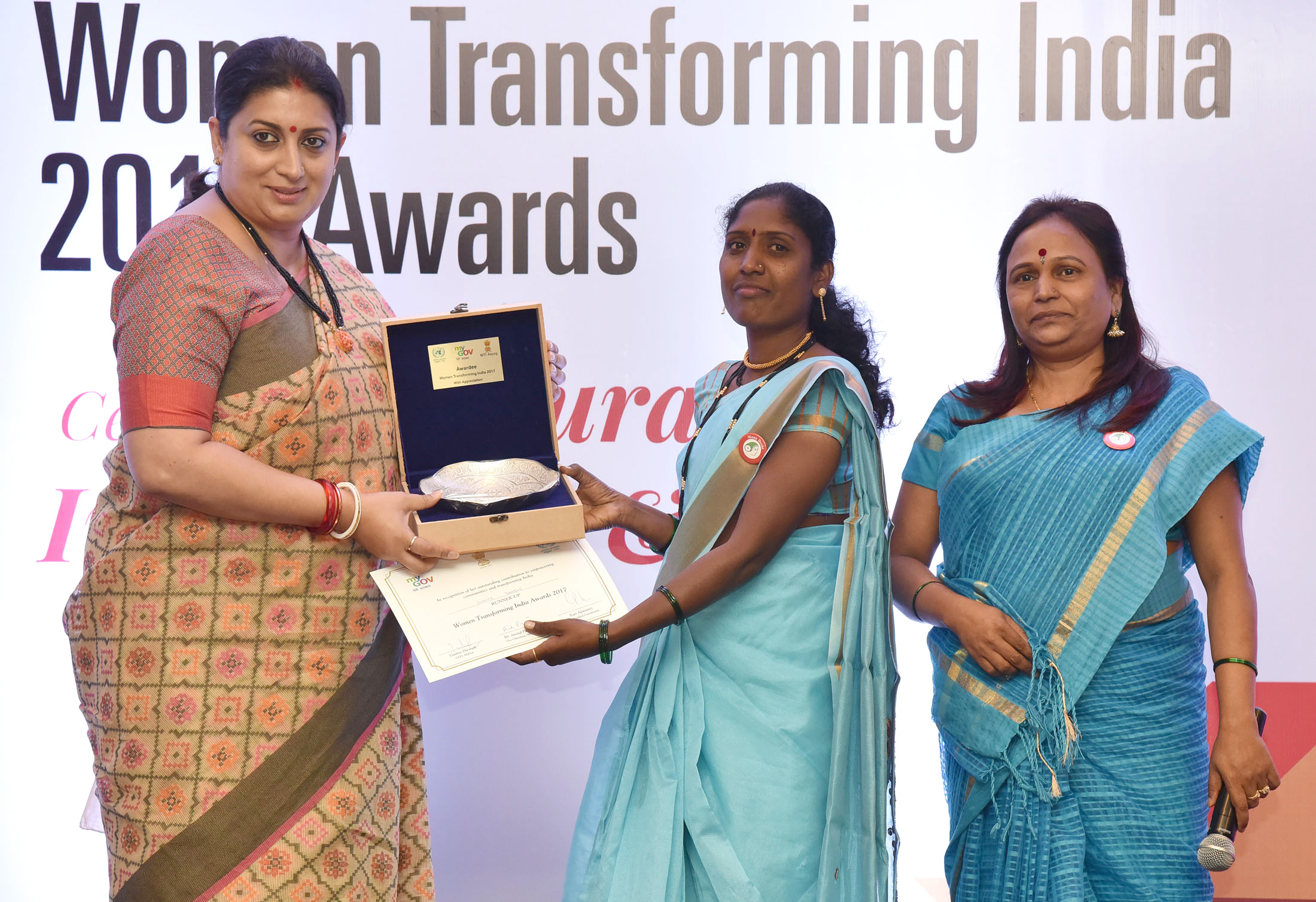
Smriti Irani presenting the Women Transforming India Award 2017 to Ms. Sunita Kamble

Kamble is from Mhasvad, Maharashtra, an area which has been affected by droughts. Goats are of major economic importance here, and a lack of trained veterinarians made it difficult to get appropriate and timely care if they became ill. She trained in the "Para-Vet Goat Programme" from the Mann Deshi Foundation to become the first goat veterinarian in the area, and went on to lead a team of seven "barefoot veterinarians". She introduced an artificial insemination service to improve the breeding of goats for both milk and meat, and has trained 350 women in the technique. Goats are seen as an "alternative and sustainable livelihood option for women-headed households in the area", and her work was recognised in 2017 by the "Women Transforming India" award.

Kamble is from the dalit or untouchable group, but her achievements have brought together members of different castes in her village: "When I entered the village, I saw a big cutout of Sunita. Sunita was smiling on that picture. ... upper caste leaders -- men -- were sitting in the house, in her house...".
