= Amar Jiban =

1876 autobiography of Rassundari Devi

- Second edition in Bengali
- Author: Rashsundari Devi
- Language: Bengali
- Genre: Autobiography
- Publication date: 1876

Amar Jiban, published in 1876, is the name of Rashsundari Devi's autobiography and is the first autobiography written by an Indian woman and also the first written by any Bengali female. It tells us about the status of women in the 19th-century Indian society and the excess amount of inequality and hardship they had to go through. It was the first full-length autobiography published in the Bengali language.

== Extract ==
"I was so immersed in a sea of housework that I was not conscious of what I was going through day and night. After some time, the desire to learn how to read properly grew very strong in me. I was angry with myself for wanting to read books. Girls did not read... People used to despise women of learning... In fact, Older women used to show a great deal of displeasure if they saw a piece of paper in the hands of a woman. But somehow I could not accept this."
