= Dighanchi =

Village in Maharashtra

Dighanchi is a village in the Atpadi taluka, which is in the Sangli district of Maharashtra, India. This is on the bank of the River Manganga in Mandesha. As of the 2011 census, there were 2262 households in the village, and the total population was 11128.

== People ==
Dighanchi has all the castes of Maharashtra.. The Dighanchi is made up of 65 percent open and other Backward Class, in addition to the Denotified and Nomadic Tribes, namely the Ramoshi, Davari Jogi/Nath Panthi Davari Gosavi, Wadar, Kaikadi, and Sangar Sangarsamaj Dhanager, among others.

== Temples ==
Dighanchi has a Mahadev temple near the Gram panchayat office in the village. Gramdevata is located at the Siddhanath Temple. Another temple is to the goddess Mariai. The Khandoba Temple and Durgamata temple are both about 1 km away from Dighanchi. ग्रामदेवता सिद्धनाथ मंदिर.ग्रामपंचायत कार्यालयाजवळ महादेवाचे मंदिर.मरियाई देवीचे मंदिर.खंडोबा आणि दुर्गामाता मंदिर (गावापासून सुमारे १ किमी अंतरावर)

== Festivals ==
Dighanchi celebrates Hindu and Buddhist festivals. Traditionally, the population of Maratha is highly influenced by the Hindu beliefs, and celebrate Hindu festivals. However the Bail Pola is celebrated highly prestigious in Dighanchi, and takes place throughout the whole village. In Dighanchi, yearly fairs also celebrate Shivjanti, diwali, ganesh utsav, and dahihandi.

== Education ==
Most of the population of Dighanchi works in labor and agriculture, as more than 50 percent of the population of the population is illiterate.

=== Educational Facilities ===
Dighanchi has primary and secondary education facilities. Dighanchi High School is available for higher education, elementary and higher secondary education. In Dighanchi there is a separate Girls High School. The elite and rich from the Dighanchi area established the English Medium School but the Backward castes are not able to accept education and employment in this village. Approximately 4 High Schools are there in Dighanchi. One I.T.I and Nursing College is also there in Indrabhagya Campus. One Agriculture Diploma college is also there.

== Library ==
In Dighanchi the government funds the library - Reading room at village level. Recent books are not available. About 2 Libraries are there. Amongst that 1 called Nagarvachanalaya, Dighanchi is Strong Library and Namdevrav Kale Nagarvachnalay is also there.
