= Rassundari Devi =

Bengali writer

Rashsundari Devi
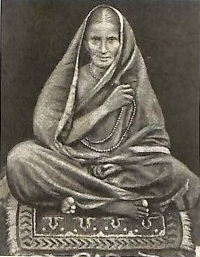
- Born: 1810; Potajiya, Bengal Presidency, British India
- Died: 1899 (aged 88–89); Calcutta, British India
- Citizenship: British India
- Occupations: Author; Housewife
- Writing career
- Language: Bengali

Rashsundari Devi (Bengali: রাসসুন্দরী দেবী) (c. 1809–1899) was a Bengali woman who is identified as the author of first full-fledged autobiography in modern Bengali literature. She is among the earliest woman writers in Bengali literature.

Rashsundari Devi was born in Eastern Bengal and was the first Indian woman to write an autobiography and the first Bengali to write an autobiography. 'Amar Jiban' was the name of her autobiography.

== Biography ==
Rashsundari Devi was born c. 1809 in the village of Potajia, in Pabna district. Her father, Padmalochan Roy, died when Rassundari was a small child. She never saw her father and was raised by her mother and relatives. Formal education was not given to girls of the time. She used to be around a boys' school run by a missionary woman in her father's house. By listening to the lessons going on at school Rashsundari learned the letters of the Bengali language. She secretly studied the alphabet from her family member's books in the flickering light of candles at night.

At age 12 she married Sitanath Sarkar from Ramdia village, Rajbari, Faridpur. She bore 12 children, of whom 7 died early. Her husband died in 1868. Her son Kishori Lal Sarkar became an advocate at Calcutta High Court and is the author of several noteworthy works.

== Autobiography ==
In 1876 Rassundari's autobiography Amar Jiban (My Life) was published. The book is in two parts, the first of which, consisting of sixteen shorter compositions narrated her autobiography. The second part, published in 1906, contained fifteen shorter compositions, each preceded by a dedicatory poem.

Dinesh Chandra Sen called her prose an 'epitome of simple prose compositions of the bygone era'.
