= Mhasoba =

Indian deity

Coordinates: 18.454361°N 73.584613°E

Mhasoba (म्हसोबा in Maharashtra), pronounced "MUH-SO-BAA", or Masoba is a horned buffalo deity of pastoral tribes in Western and Southern India. In Maharashtra, many Gawlis (tribes making their living cow-herding and by selling milk and milk products) have been worshipping this deity for hundreds of years.

Rosalind O'Hanlon, Professor at the University of Oxford stated that Mhasoba is traditionally very popular in the Maratha caste. She quotes about the devotion of the Marathas in the 19th century to Mhasoba as follows:

You will not find a single family among the Marathas who do not set up in the grounds around their village some stone or other in the name of Mhasoba, smear it with red lead, and offer incense to it; who without taking Mhasoba's name will not put his hand to the seed-box of the plough, will not put the harrow to the field, and will not put the measure to the heap of threshed corn on the threshing floor.

Mhasoba is also worshiped by the Bhonsles. There is a shrine of Mhasoba at the Purandar Fort and there is also a beautiful water reservoir nearby that is named after him i.e. 'Mhasoba Taki'.

Mhasoba's shrines are not Brahminical and there is nothing written about him in Sanskrit literature. He is considered a "kshetrapal" i.e. guardian deity worshiped by farmers. He is also considered a "guardian brother of the seven river goddesses termed as Sati-Asara"

Mhasoba is sometime connected with Shiva, who may have been a pre-Vedic deity adopted by Hindu culture. In the Mhasoba cult of Maharashtra, Mhasoba (Mahisha/Mahesha, which is another name for Shiva/Shankar) is worshipped with his wife Jogubai (Durga).

His temples are found mainly in States of Maharashtra and Andhra Pradesh. Masoba is considered to be God of Spirit and temples are generally found near Smashan (cemeteries) or outside the village.

Many communities like Lajjhars, Joshis, Pradhans, Mangs, Chamars and Dhangars worship Masoba and at times offer sacrifice of he-goats. They believe that Masoba is their guardian deity and protects them from evil spirits. However, it is the Dalit community, which mainly worship Masoba. There are many places, where annually a religious rally (Yatra) called Masoba Yatra is held, when the deity is carried in Palkhi (palanquin).
