= Majya Jalmachi Chittarkatha =

Autobiography by Shantabai Kamble

- Author: Shantabai Kamble
- Original title: Majya Jalmachi Chittarkatha
- Cover artist: Chadrakant Kamble
- Language: Marathi
- Genre: Autobiography
- Publisher: Usha Wagh
- Publication date: 1983
- Publication place: India
- Media type: Dalit Woman's Autobiography
- Pages: 143
- ISBN: 9789357952118

Majya Jalmachi Chittarkatha (translated as The Kaleidoscope Story of My Life) is an autobiography of Shantabai Kamble published in 1983. This is considered the first autobiographical narrative by a Dalit woman writer. The work has been translated into various languages and is required reading for Marathi literary students at the University of Mumbai.

== Background ==
Najabai Sakharam Babar (renamed Shantabai Krishnaji Kamble after her marriage), was the first Dalit woman teacher in Solapur district. She began teaching at the Solapur District Board School in 1942. Ten year, in 1952, she completed two years of teacher training and served as an education extension officer in the Jat taluka of Sangli district. She wrote Mazhya Jalmachi Chittarkatha (The Kaleidoscopic Story of My Life) after she retired from teaching in 1981. It was first published in the magazine 'Purvi' in the year 1982 through the efforts of Dinkar Sakrikar. It was teleserialised as Najuka starring actors like Nilu Pule, Sulabha Deshpande, Charushila Vachhani on Mumbai Doordarshan in 1990. It has also been translated into French and English. The book was later translated into English by a Femina magazine editor called Shantabai Gokhale who struggled with the meaning of the title. After consulting multiple dictionaries, the editor eventually decided to translate the context rather than the word, resulting in the English title, "The Story of My Tattered Life." The word chittarkatha literally means a picture story but also indicates a sense of pieces of pictures being put together like a jigsaw puzzle.

== Synopsis ==
The autobiography Majya Jalmachi Chittarkatha by Dalit woman writer Shantabai Kamble, the protagonist of the story, Naja, bears the brunt of class, caste and gender. Naja is from the Mahar caste, one of the biggest Dalit communities in Maharashtra. It is a poignant story of Dalit women's struggles in India. The book, which was published in Marathi in 1986, describes Kamble's experiences with caste and gender prejudice in Indian culture. Kamble, who belonged to the untouchable Mahar caste, endured several persecutions throughout her life, including humiliation at school, her workplace, and even at home. Kamble's book exposes the harsh reality of India's caste system, a discriminating and oppressive institution. She details early recollections of her family's poverty and misery as a result of their lower caste rank. In exchange for leftover food supplied by upper castes, the Mahar caste was forced to do village responsibilities like as sweeping and patrolling the village. Despite being able to earn a living elsewhere, Kamble's family was forced to bear the burden of this unjust and unpaid village service known as taralki.

Kamble's experiences with untouchability and humiliation, even in revered places like temples and schools, left an indelible mark on her. In the book, she outlines how even as a teacher, she encountered hostility from dominant castes who threatened her to return home or risk being beaten up and sent back in humiliation. She and her husband were even driven away from a village due to the envy of a dominant caste leader who refused to provide their school with an award. In her autobiography, Kamble also discusses the caste structure, stating that women from lower castes looked down on those even lower than them. Despite the fact that all of these women endured discrimination owing to their lower caste rank, this hierarchy was maintained. Despite the difficulties she encountered, Kamble's memoir celebrates the power of education and knowledge to pave the way for freedom from slavery. Overall, Majya Jalmachi Chittarkatha is a significant contribution to Dalit literature that highlights the plight of Dalit women in Indian society.
