= Atpadi taluka =

Indian taluka in the Sangli district

Atpadi is a taluka in Sangli district of Maharashtra, in 2022 it is one of the talukas of the district, belonging to the Vita sub-division of the district. In 2012 the taluka suffered a severe drought, reportedly the worst in living memory, similar conditions were faced in 2016 and 2019, in 2020 the taluka was hit by floods that caused losses to lives and properties. India's best quality pomegranates are grown in the taluka and the taluka is a pioneer amongst exporters of the fruit, though adverse climatic conditions and diseases have hit the growers. There is a proposal and demand that Sangli district be split to form a new Mandesh district, (Note: Mandesh is the name given to the geographical region that lies on the banks of the river Man. It is drought prone. To it belong talukas of Satara, Sangli and Solapur districts. It is named after the Man river) with Atpadi taluka being one of the talukas to be included in this new district.

== Demographics ==
Religions in Atpadi taluka (2011)
Religion	Percent
Hinduism	94.19%
Islam	3.09%
Buddhism	2.18%
Other or not stated	0.54%

Atpadi taluka had a population of 138,455, entirely in rural areas. The sex ratio is 995 females per 1000 males and the literacy rate is 72.74%. 16,244 were under 6 years of age. Scheduled Castes and Scheduled Tribes make up 12.41% and 0.56% of the population respectively.

Languages of Atpadi taluk (2011)
1. Marathi (97.4%)
2. Hindi (1.52%)
3. Others (1.11%)

At the time of the 2011 census, 97.37% of the population spoke Marathi and 1.52% Hindi as their first language.

== Swatantrapur Vasahat ==
Swatantrapur Vasahat an open jail. It holds life term inmates. It is located in the taluka.

== Notable person ==
Rhuturaj jadhav , a soldier honored with the "Sainya Seva Medal."
