= Shantabai Kamble =

Indian writer (1923–2023)

Shantabai Krushnaji Kamble
- Born: 1 March 1923; Mahud, Sangola, Solapur, Bombay Presidency, British India
- Died: 25 January 2023 (aged 99); Pune, Maharashtra, India
- Notable work: Majya Jalmachi Chittarkatha
- Children: Arun Krushnaji Kamble

Shantabai Krushnaji Kamble (1 March 1923 – 25 January 2023) was an Indian Marathi writer and Dalit activist. She wrote the first female Dalit autobiography.

== Biography ==
=== Early age ===
Shantabai Krushnaji Kamble was born in a Mahar Dalit family on 1 March 1923. Her birthplace was Mahud which is located in Solapur. She was from a poor family. The social and economic status of her community was quite low.

=== Educational struggle ===
The traditional attitude in India towards education for people of lower class and women at the time made it so education was prohibited for, however her parents decided to send her to school because of her extraordinary talent. She was awarded a three rupees scholarship for paper, ink, notebooks, and more school supplies, but she wasn't allowed to sit inside the classroom and had to learn from outside.

== Autobiography ==
Shantabai Kamble's autobiography Majya Jalmachi Chittarkatha translated as The Kaleidoscope Story of My Life was published as a complete book in 1986. First presented to reading audience in Purva Magazine in 1983. Later it was tele-serialized for the viewers as Najuka on the Mumbai Doordarshan in 1990 and translated into French and English. Kamble started writing her Chittarkatha after her retirement as a teacher. It is considered the first autobiographical narrative by a Dalit woman writer. This book is included in the University of Mumbai's syllabus. Chiefly the book raises the issue of two-fold marginalization and oppression, both caste oppression and gendered discrimination towards women by their male peers. In this context she portrays her struggle as a female Dalit writer. In the dedication to her book she writes, "To my Aaye-Appa [mother and father] who worked the entire day in the hot glaring sun, hungry and without water, and through the drudgery of labor, with hunger pinching their stomach, educated me and brought me from darkness into light."

== Death ==
Shantabai Kamble died at her daughter's home in Pune, on 25 January 2023, at the age of 99.

== Videos ==
- Pioneering autobiography: Untouchable castes' woman from India Shantabai Kamble.
- "Najuka" Marathi Series on doordarshan.

== Bibliography ==
- Poisoned Bread: Translations from Modern Marathi Dalit Literature by Arjuna Ḍāṅgaḷe

Contributor Arjuna Ḍāṅgaḷe Edition: reprint
