= List of Dalit works =

Dalit literature refers to a body of writing across Indian languages that centers the lived experiences of Dalit communities, confronting caste-based discrimination and social exclusion. It spans genres ranging from autobiography and poetry to short stories and novels. Its modern articulation gained momentum in the mid-20th century, drawing on earlier anti-caste thought such as Jyotirao Phule’s Gulamgiri (1873) and the writings of B. R. Ambedkar, and was galvanized by the Dalit Panthers movement in the 1970s.

This list collects notable works that have defined and advanced Dalit literature’s themes, aesthetics, and public impact.

| Title (including translated titles) | Author |
|---|---|
| Becoming Babasaheb: The Life and Times of Bhimrao Ramji Ambedkar (Volume 1) | Aakash Singh Rathore |
| Fakira | Annabhau Sathe |
| Unclaimed Terrain | Ajay Navaria |
| Dalit Kitchens of Marathwada | Shahu Patole |
| Bheda | Akhila Naik |
| Republic of Caste: Thinking Equality in the Time of Neoliberal Hindutva | Anand Teltumbde |
| The Persistence of Caste: The Khairlanji Murders and India's Hidden Apartheid | Anand Teltumbde |
| Khairlanji: A Strange And Bitter Crop | Anand Teltumbde |
| Karya | Aravind Malagatti |
| Poisoned Bread: Translations from Modern Marathi Dalit Literature | Arjun Dangle |
| Homeless in my Land: Translations from Modern Marathi Dalit Short Stories | Arjun Dangle |
| No entry for the new Sun: Translations from modern Marathi Dalit poetry | Arjun Dangle |
| Annihilation of Caste | B.R. Ambedkar |
| Castes in India: Their Mechanism, Genesis and Development | B.R. Ambedkar |
| Who were the Shudras? | B.R. Ambedkar |
| Buddha or Karl Marx | B.R. Ambedkar |
| When I Hid My Caste: Stories (जेव्हा मी जात चोरली होती) | Baburao Bagul |
| The Prisons We Broke | Baby Kamble |
| Kanshiram: Leader of the Dalits | Badri Narayan |
| Karukku | Bama |
| Harum-Scarum Saar & Other Stories | Bama |
| Sangati: Events | Bama |
| VANMAM: Vendetta | Bama |
| Just One Word: Short Stories | Bama |
| The Ichi Tree Monkey: New and Selected Stories | Bama |
| Translating Caste | Basu Tapan |
| One Hundred Poems of Chokha Mela | Chokhamela, Chandrakant Kaluram Mhatre |
| Letters to Namdeo Dhasal | Chandramohan S |
| Vultures | Dalpat Chauhan |
| Fear and Other Stories | Dalpat Chauhan |
| Baluta | Daya Pawar |
| Under My Dark Skin Flows A Red River | Debi Chatterjee |
| Kusumabale | Devanura Mahadeva |
| Defying the Odds: The Rise of Dalit Entrepreneurs | Devesh Kapur |
| Ambedkar's World: The Making of Babasaheb and the Dalit Movement | Eleanor Zelliot |
| Untouchable Spring | G. Kalyana Rao |
| Understanding Caste: From Buddha To Ambedkar And Beyond | Gail Omvedt |
| Seeking Begumpura | Gail Omvedt |
| Dalit Visions (Tracts for the Times) | Gail Omvedt |
| Ambedkar: Towards an Enlightened India | Gail Omvedt |
| Father May Be an Elephant and Mother Only a Small Basket, But... | Gogu Shyamala |
| Gabbilam: A Dalit Epic | Gurram Jashuva |
| The Adivasi Will Not Dance | Hansda Sowvendra Shekhar |
| Pethavan: The Begetter | Imaiyam |
| If There is a God and Other Stories: Short Stories | Imaiyam |
| An Order from the Sky and Other Stories | Imaiyam |
| Stories of Social Awakening: Reflections of Dalit Refugee Lives of Bengal | Jatin Bala |
| Gulamgiri | Jyotirao Phule |
| How Are You Veg? Dalit Stories from Telugu | Joopaka Subhadra |
| Dalit Literatures in India | Joshil K. Abraham |
| Dalit Text: Aesthetics and Politics Re-imagined | Judith Misrahi-barak |
| Concealing Caste: Narratives of Passing and Personhood in Dalit Literature | K. Satyanarayana |
| An Introduction to Tamil Dalit Literature | K.A. Geetha |
| The Scar | K.A. Gunasekaran |
| Murder in Mudukulathur: Caste and Electoral Politics in Tamil Nadu | K.A. Manikumar |
| Dalit Lekhika: Women's Writings from Bengal | Kalyani Thakur Charal |
| Days Will Come Back | Kamal Dev Pall |
| Why I Am Not a Hindu | Kancha Ilaiah |
| Writing Resistance: The Rhetorical Imagination of Hindi Dalit Literature | Laura R. Brueck |
| The Branded | Laxman Gaikwad |
| Broken Man: In Search Of Homeland | Loknath Yashwant |
| The Oxford India Anthology of Malayalam Dalit Writing | M. Dasan |
| Don’t Want Caste | M.R. Renukumar |
| City, Slum and the Marginalised: Dalits and Muslims in Delhi Slums | M.V. Bijulal |
| Interrogating My Chandal Life: An Autobiography of a Dalit | Manoranjan Byapari |
| The Runaway Boy | Manoranjan Byapari |
| A Dalit History | Meena Kandasamy |
| Ms Militancy | Meena Kandasamy |
| The Gypsy Goddess | Meena Kandasamy |
| Before It Rains Again | Mudnakudu Chinnaswamy |
| Untouchable | Mulk Raj Anand |
| An Anthology Of Dalit Literature | Mulk Raj Anand |
| Critical Essays on Dalit Literature | Murali Manohar |
| Give Us This Day A Feast Of Flesh | N.D. Rajkumar |
| उन्हाच्या कटाविरुद्ध | Nagraj Manjule |
| A Current of Blood | Namdeo Dhasal |
| Namdeo Dhasal: Poet of the Underground Poems 1972-2006 | Namdeo Dhasal |
| Untouchables: My Family’s Triumphant Journey Out of the Caste System in Modern India | Dr. Narendra Jadhav |
| To Be Cared For: The Power of Conversion and Foreignness of Belonging in an Indian Slum | Nathaniel Roberts |
| Joothan: An Untouchable's Life | Omprakash Valmiki |
| Salaam | Omprakash Valmiki |
| Ghuspaithiye | Omprakash Valmiki |
| The Grip of Change | P. Sivakami |
| The Taming of Women | P. Sivakami & Pritham K. Chakravarthy (Tr.) |
| Black Coffee in a Coconut Shell: Caste as Lived Experience | Perumal Murugan |
| Let The Rumours Be True | Pradnya Daya Pawar |
| The Dalit Brahmin And Other Stories | Priya Adarkar (tr.) Sharankumar Limbale |
| Anthology of Telugu Dalit Writing | Purushotham |
| Dalit Personal Narratives: Reading Caste, Nation and Identity | Raj Kumar |
| Dalit Literature and Criticism | Raj Kumar |
| Thunderstorm: Dalit Stories | Ratan Kumar Sambharia |
| Anthology of Tamil Dalit Writing | Ravikumar |
| On the Threshold: Songs of Chokhamela (Sacred Literature Series) | Rohini Mokashi-Punekar |
| Touchable Tales: Publishing And Reading Dalit Literature | S. Anand |
| Dalit Voices in Indian Poetry: A Study of Malayalam and Marathi Poems | Sakunthala A.I. |
| Collected Plays of Sanjay Jiwane: a saga of dalit-ism | Sanjay Jiwane |
| Dalit Kitchens of Marathwada | Shahu Patole (tr.) Bhushan Korgaonkar |
| Majya Jalmachi Chittarkatha | Shantabai Kamble |
| Survival and Other Stories: Bangla Dalit Fiction in Translation | Sankar Prasad Singha |
| The Outcaste (Akkarmashi) | Sharankumar Limbale |
| Hindu: A Novel | Sharankumar Limbale |
| Towards An Aesthetic Of Dalit Literature: History, Controversies And Considerations | Sharankumar Limbale |
| Writing Caste/Writing Gender: Reading Dalit Women's Testimonials | Sharmila Rege |
| Ooru Keri | Siddalingaiah |
| A Word With You, World: The Autobiography of a Poet | Siddalingaiah |
| Ants Among Elephants: An Untouchable Family and the Making of Modern India | Sujatha Gidla |
| Affairs of Caste: a Young Diary | Sumeet Samos |
| Dalit Feminist Theory: A Reader | Sunaina Arya |
| Caste Matters | Suraj Yengde |
| No Alphabet in Sight: New Dalit Writing from South India | Susie J. Tharu |
| Steel Nibs are Sprouting: New Dalit Writing from South India Dossier 2 | Susie J. Tharu |
| The Exercise of Freedom: An Introduction to Dalit Writing | Susie J. Tharu |
| Hindi Dalit Literature in the United Provinces: Swami Acchutanand and Chandrika Prasad Jigyasu, 1900-1930 | Tapan Basu |
| Listen to the Flames: Texts and Readings from the Margins | Tapan Basu |
| Untouchable Fictions: Literary Realism and the Crisis of Caste | Toral Jatin Gajarawala |
| Manikarnika | Tulsiram |
| Motherwit | Urmila Pawar |
| The Weave of My Life: A Dalit Woman's Memoirs (Aaydan) | Urmila Pawar |
| Growing Up Untouchable in India: A Dalit Autobiography | Vasant Moon |
| Kakka: a Dalit Novel | Vemula Yellaiah |
| Coming Out as Dalit: A Memoir | Yashica Dutt |
| Water in a Broken Pot | Yogesh Maitreya |
| Singing/Thinking Anti Caste: Essays on Anti Caste Music and Text | Yogesh Maitreya |
| The Bridge of Migration | Yogesh Maitreya |
| Blues from Bhimnagar | Yogesh Maitreya |
