= PES University, EC Campus =

College in Bangalore, India

PES University, Electronic City Campus
- Former names: PES School of Engineering (2005 - 2013); PES Institute of Technology, Bangalore South Campus (2013 - 2018); PES University EC Campus (2018 - present)
- Motto: To create professionally superior and ethically strong global workforce.
- Type: Private
- Established: November 2005
- Founders: Dr. M. R. Doreswamy
- Affiliations: PES University (2018 - Present); Visvesvaraya Technological University (2005–2018)
- Chancellor: Prof. Jawahar Doreswamy
- Vice-Chancellor: Dr. J. Surya Prasad
- Principal: Dr. Subash S. Kulkarni
- Location: Bangalore, Karnataka, India; 12°51′42.23″N 77°39′52.27″E
- Campus: 50 acres (20 ha); Urban
- Colors: Blue and Red
- Mascot: Jago
- Website: pes.edu

PES (People's Education Society) University, Electronic City Campus (PESU EC) is a constituent college of PES University, a private university, located on Hosur Road, near Electronic City, Bangalore, India. PESU EC Campus was established in 2005 as PES School of Engineering (PESSE), later called PES Institute of Technology, Bangalore South Campus (PESIT South Campus), and was affiliated to Visvesvaraya Technological University, Belagavi. The college was included as one of the three campuses under PES University in 2018.

== History ==
PES University, Electronic City Campus is managed by the People‘s Education Society (PES), which was founded in 1972, in a rented gymnasium in Bangalore, with around 40 students. PES currently manages over 45 educational programs in Karnataka and neighbouring Andhra Pradesh focused on four main educational areas: Engineering, Medicine, Management and Life Sciences. The college (formerly known as PESIT Bangalore South Campus and earlier as PES School of Engineering (PESSE)) was established with AICTE approval in 2005 and was affiliated to Visvesvaraya Technological University. In August 2018, PESIT South Campus was included as a constituent college of PES University and was renamed as PES University, Electronic City Campus.

== Campus ==
PES University, Electronic City Campus is located on Hosur Road and is about a kilometer from Electronic City and is spread over an area of around 50 acres. PESU EC is the first academic campus on the IT Corridor of Bangalore City located around information technology companies such as Wipro, Infosys, HCL, TCS, Hewlett-Packard, etc. The campus is located adjacent to the NICE Ring Road exit and is located around 8 kilometers from the Silk Board Junction.

It houses a cricket ground and a football ground near the entrance of the campus. There are also two basketball courts, a tennis court and two badminton courts on campus. There are four blocks of which the main block houses the departments of Computer Science, Electronics and Communication Engineering, MCA and MBA. The Mechanical Engineering block is located as a separate building directly behind the main block. The Pixel Park building, formerly hosted the interim campus of the Azim Premji University. It is located adjacent to the main building and directly overlooks the boys' hostel building.

The construction of a medical college and hospital is currently underway within the campus for the PESU Institute of Medical Sciences and Research. The hospital will have 1,200 beds, including a 300-bed super-speciality wing, and will come up on a 10-acre plot.

PES University, Electronic City Campus admits students to courses on basis of their merit in the Karnataka CET, JEE Main or through the PESSAT (People's Education Society Scholastic Aptitude Test), the all-India online entrance exam for admission to PES University. Students are also admitted through a management quota, which may not place any merit requirements. There is a lateral entry scheme in place, by which students holding diploma degrees can enter directly to the second year of study in engineering. Students, upon graduating, receive a Bachelor of Technology degree.

=== Undergraduate programs ===
PES University, Electronic City Campus offers full-time, four-year undergraduate (Bachelor of Technology) programs in the following disciplines:

- Computer Science and Engineering
- Electronics and Communication Engineering

The college also offers Bachelor of Business Administration and Bachelor of Commerce programs.

=== Graduate programs ===
PES university, Electronic City Campus offers postgraduate programs in the following disciplines

- Master of Business Administration
- M. Tech. in Data Science & Machine Learning
- Executive M. Tech in VLSI

== Student life ==
=== Events ===
The following events are conducted by PES University EC campus, annually:

- Maaya (College Fest) – the flagship fest of PES which takes place in October
- inGenius – 24 hour intercollegiate coding hackathon
- TEDxPESUECC (formerly TEDxPESITBSC)
- Esperenza (MCA Fest)
- Kludge – 24-hour electronic hardware design challenge
- IEEE Event - KALPANA

=== Clubs ===
==== TECHWARTS ====
Established in 2018, TECHWARTS is an consortium of four clubs/forums.

- Predict This! – A club for machine learning enthusiasts.
- onCreate() – A club for Android Application Development.
- We_the_programmers – A competitive coding club.
- PIXEL – AR/VR and Game development club.

==== The Pixelloid Club ====
The photography club of PESU-ECC is responsible for handling the professional photography for all campus events. Over the years, Pixelloid has covered events such as Maaya, Activity Day and TEDx-PESUECC amongst many others.

==== Team Enigma ====
SAE INDIA Club for design and fabrication of vehicles for participating in SAE BAJA and FORMULA SAE competitions.

==== Team Avions ====
Avions, the Aero Design Club at PESIT-BSC design, fabricate, and test micro unmanned aerial vehicles. Team Avions officially represents PESU-ECC at various national and international aero design events.

They participated for the first time in SAE Aerodesign East 2013 (Micro Class) held at Fortworth, Texas and was placed 14th overall. More recently, Team Avions has been placed second overall SAE Aero Design West 2014 (Micro class).

They participate in SAEISS Aero Design Challenge that takes place in Chennai every year, and have placed 1st overall in 2017 and 4th in 2018.
