= Chimanlal Harilal Setalvad =

Indian barrister and jurist (1864–1947)

Sir Chimanlal Harilal Setalvad KCIE
- Portrait by Walter Stoneman, 1930
- Born: July 1864
- Died: 10 December 1947 (aged 83)
- Citizenship: British subject; Dominion of India
- Occupations: Barrister; jurist

Sir Chimanlal Harilal Setalvad KCIE (July 1864 – 10 December 1947) was an Indian barrister and jurist who practised in the Bombay High Court in the early 20th century.

== Life and background ==
Chimanlal was born in July 1864 at Bharuch, Bharuch district, then in the Bombay Presidency of British India and now part of the state of Gujarat. The eldest of four brothers, he was born in a Gujarati Brahmin family which had achieved distinction in the law for the preceding two generations. The surname Setalvad derives from the family's origins in the Punjab, where their surname was Talvad. Some Talvads who were leaders of their community became known as Seth – Talvads ("Chiefs of the Talvads") which over time become "Setalvad". In the 18th century, some Setalvads migrated to present-day Gujarat and settled around Surat, serving as paymasters in the imperial Mughal armies.

Chimanlal's grandfather, Ambashankar Brijrai Setalvad (1782–1853) worked for the East India Company in the early 19th century, initially as a sreshtadar (registrar) in the Sadr Diwani Adalat, the Supreme Civil Claims Court. He was subsequently appointed Sadr Amin, or subordinate judge, for Ahmedabad district. Soon becoming renowned for his legal acumen, he eventually rose to Principal Sadr Amin, the highest judicial post then open to non-Europeans, and held the post at the time of his death. Chimanlal's father, Rao Sahib Harilal Ambashankar Setalvad (1821–1899), also served as Sadr Amin of Ahmedabad and was awarded the title of Rao Sahib by the British government upon his retirement in 1877. He subsequently served as dewan of the salute state of Limbdi.

== Career ==
An alumnus of Elphinstone College, Mumbai, he served as Vice-Chancellor of Bombay University and as a member of the Governor of Bombay's Executive Council. He also was founding President of Bahishkrit Hitakarini Sabha, established by B.R. Ambedkar in 1924.

Chimanlal was recognised by Gandhi as an impartial advocate of great integrity. While in favour of independence from Britain, Chimanlal was opposed to Partition; sadly, he lived to see Partition and its accompanying horrors become a reality before his death on 10 December 1947, aged 83.

== Honours ==
Setalvad was knighted in the 1919 New Year Honours List. He was further appointed a Knight Commander of the Order of the Indian Empire (KCIE) in the 1924 Birthday Honours list.

== Family ==
He was the father of M.C. Setalvad, later Attorney General of India from 1950 to 1963. His great-granddaughter is Teesta Setalvad, a noted journalist and civil rights activist.

== Works ==
- Recollections & reflections, an autobiography, Padma Publications, 1946.

== In popular culture ==
In the film Gandhi (1982), Chimanlal Setalvad is portrayed by Habib Tanvir as a member of the Hunter Commission, in which role he cross-examines General Dyer (credited in movie as Indian Barrister).
