= Mang (caste) =

Indian caste, mainly in Maharashtra

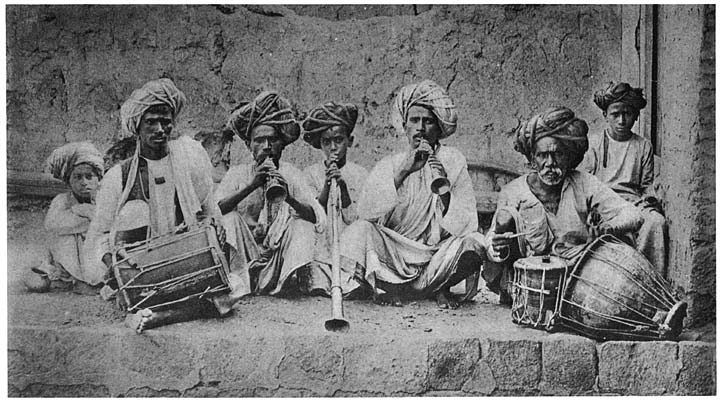
Matang musicians with drums (Russell, 1916)

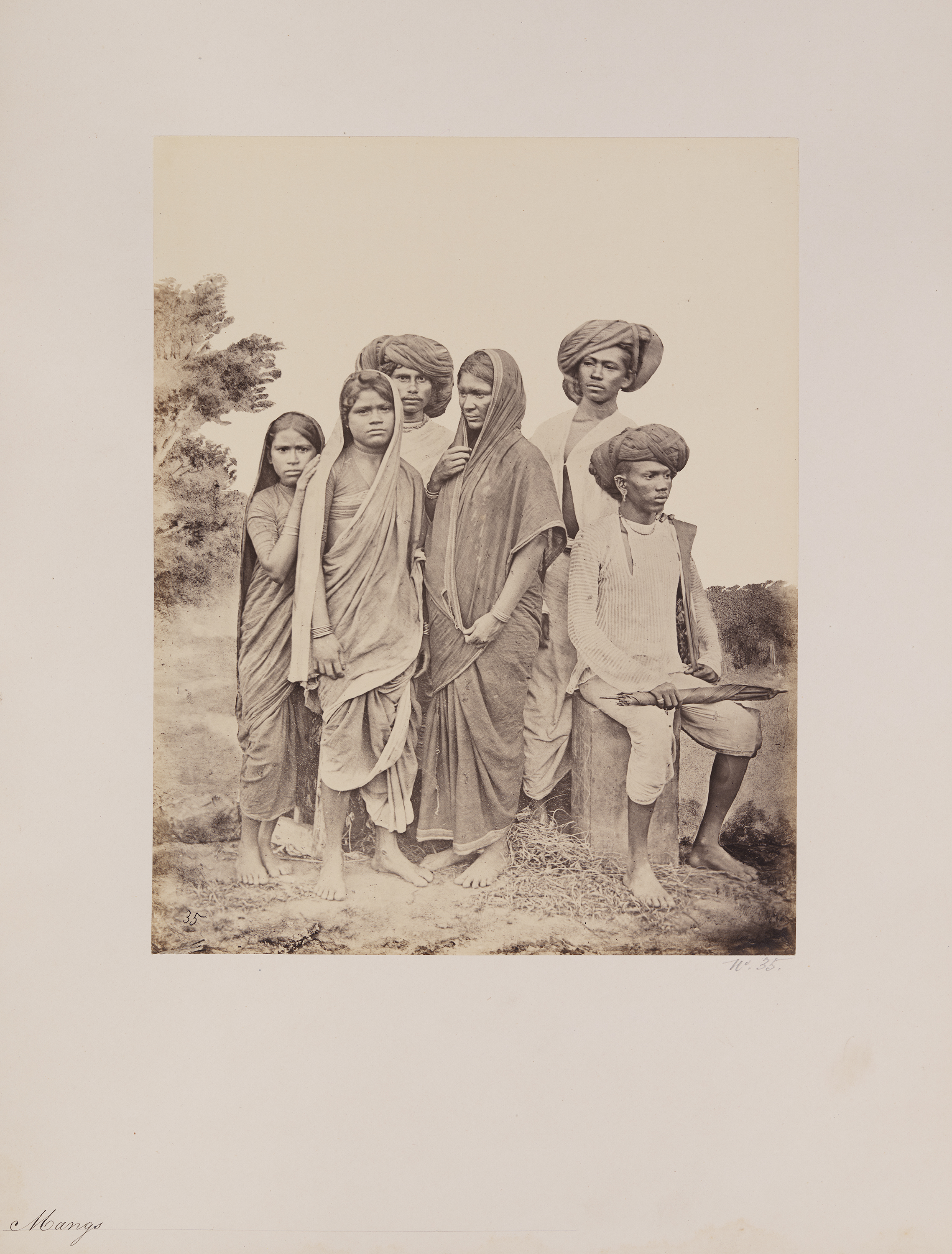
Matang in western India (c. 1855–1862).

The Mang, or Matang, is an Indian caste mainly residing in the state of Maharashtra. Matang are known as Madiga in Telangana, Andhra Pradesh and Karnataka.

The community was historically believed to be associated with village security and professions such as rope making, broom making, cattle castration, leather curing, midwifery, and being musicians, executioners, and funeral directors. In modern-day India, they are listed as a Scheduled Caste, Their origins lie in the Narmada Valley of India, and they were formerly classified as a criminal tribe under the Criminal Tribes Acts of the British Raj.

== Religion ==
The most of Mang practice Hinduism and in modern times, they are ardent followers of B. R. Ambedkar and Shivaji Maharaj. The Mang celebrate all major Hindu festivals, as well as the annual Jatara festival for the deity Maisamma, which entails the sacrifice of sheep and goats and a feast of lamb and goat meat.

According to the 2011 census, there were 35,831 Mangs in Maharashtra who were Buddhists.

== Society and culture ==
Before the British era, the Mang were one of the twelve hereditary village servants known the Bara Balutedar. They were the hereditary rope makers and village entertainers. For their services they received a share of the village produce. Although some converted to Buddhism, traditionally the Mangs are Hindus and observe the Hindu rituals of Jawal (first haircut), shendi, lagna, and funerary rites. In the early 20th century, the Mang began to form caste associations to advocate their cause, such as the Mang Samaj (1932) and Mang Society (1923).

== Notables ==
- Annabhau Sathe, Maharashtra social reformer

== See also ==
- Dalit Kitchens of Marathwada
