= PES University =

University in Bengaluru, India

- Former name: PES Institute of Technology (1988 - 2013)
- Motto: Perseverance, Excellence, Service
- Type: Private
- Established: 1988; 38 years ago
- Founder: Dr. M. R. Doreswamy
- Accreditation: UGC, IET
- Affiliations: PES University
- Chancellor: Prof. Jawahar Doreswamy
- Vice-Chancellor: Dr. Suryaprasad J.
- Academic staff: 464 (All campuses)
- Undergraduates: 6,656 (All campuses)
- Postgraduates: 1,091 (All campuses)
- Doctoral students: 86 (All campuses)
- Location: Bengaluru, Karnataka, India; 12°56′1.75″N 77°32′4.12″E
- Campus: 30 acres (12 ha); Urban
- Colors: Blue and red
- Mascot: Jago
- Website: pes.edu

People's Education Society University (PESU), is a private university in Bengaluru, India. Established in 1988, it is focused on the following educational areas: Engineering, Management, Law, Economics, Commerce, Architecture, Design, Psychology, Arts, Medicine and Life Sciences. The institution offers both foundation courses in these areas, as well as specializations, with a Bachelor's, Master's, or PhD degree. The college was established as PES University in 2013, as a private university. There are three campuses under PES University in Bangalore: Ring Road Campus located at Banashankari 3rd stage outer ring road Bangalore, Electronic City Campus located at Electronic City hosur road Bangalore, and Hanmumanth Nagar Campus located at Banashankari 1st stage Bangalore.

== History ==
PESU is managed by the People‘s Education Society (PES), which was founded in 1972, in a rented gymnasium in Bengaluru, with around 40 students. PES currently manages over 45 educational programs in Karnataka and neighboring Andhra Pradesh, with a total of over 18,000 students.

PESU was started as PESIT in 1988 as the first engineering college under the PES group of institutions. The college was affiliated to Visvesvaraya Technological University, Belagavi and later became an autonomous college under VTU. The college was established as PES University in 2013 and renamed as PES University.

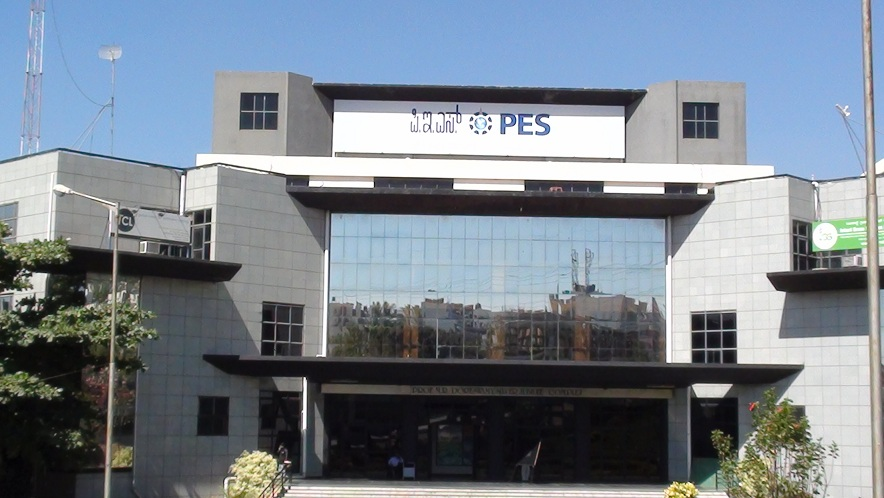
Prof. M. R. Doreswamy Silver Jubilee Complex (A-Block)

== PES University ==
PES University was established as a private university by PES University Act, 2012 (Karnataka Act 16 of 2013) in 2013, to establish and incorporate in the State of Karnataka a university of unitary nature in the private sector to promote and undertake the advancement of university education in Engineering, Medicine, Pharmacy, Science, Arts, Social Science, Computer Applications, Humanities and Management.

There are five campuses under PES University:

- PES University, Ring Road Campus
- PES University, Electronic City Campus
- PES University, Hanumantha Nagar Campus (formed by the merger of PES College of Pharmacy and PES Degree College)
- PES IMSR, Kuppam, Andhar Pradesh
- PES Public School, Chittoor, Andhar Pradesh

== Academic profile ==
=== Admission criteria ===
PESU admits 40% of its students to undergraduate courses based on their Karnataka CET ranks and 60% of its students based on percentiles received in the Joint Entrance Examination (JEE). PESU also admits students under a Management quota, which may not place any merit requirements. There is a lateral entry scheme in place, by which students holding diploma degrees can directly enter the second year of study in engineering. On graduating, students receive a Bachelor of Technology degree.

Students are admitted to postgraduate courses based on their GATE test scores as well as on their Post Graduate Karnataka CET scores. Upon graduating, they receive a Master of Technology degree.

== Faculty and research ==
Crucible Of Research and Innovation (CORI) is a multi-disciplinary research center at PES University. It was inaugurated by Dr. C. N. R. Rao (former Director, Indian Institute of Science) on 7 February 2010. It has research facilities and a set of dedicated research staff who carry out research in various areas.

Centre for Intelligent Systems (CIS) is a research center at PES University which researches on topics like Control Systems, Speech, Image and Signal Processing, Robotics, Artificial Intelligence and Low Power VLSI design. Selected students do internships in the PES Innovation Lab (formerly Microsoft Innovation Lab) on the university campus.

== Rankings ==
University and College rankings

Engineering – India
- NIRF (2024): 101-150

The university was ranked in the 101-150 band for engineering in India by National Institutional Ranking Framework (NIRF) in 2024.

== Controversy ==
=== 2026 classroom incident ===
On March 24, 2026, a major controversy after a video went viral showing an adjunct professor, Dr. Muralidhar Deshpande, making communal remarks and allegedly calling a Muslim student a "terrorist" multiple times during a classroom session. The university subsequently suspended the professor pending an internal inquiry, stating that it "does not condone discriminatory behaviour." The incident led to a police complaint filed by the National Students' Union of India and widespread calls for stricter faculty code of conduct and sensitivity training on campus.

=== 2023 suicides ===
On July 17, 2023, a student committed suicide by jumping off the eighth floor of a building on the university campus. The deceased was later identified as Aditya Prabhu, a 19-year old Bachelor of Technology student of the university. The incident occurred after he was allegedly caught using a mobile phone during an examination. Aditya was escorted out of the examination hall at around 11:30 am (IST). He was counselled by the college authorities and informed that his parents would be notified. Distressed, he left the room and jumped to his death some time between 12:30 and 1:00 pm. Aditya's parents then proceeded to file a police complaint against the university management holding them responsible for his death. Aditya's mother alleged through social media that Aditya told her he was being harassed by the college faculty who told him that "it’s better to die than to do such things". The university also caught flak for leaked screenshots from a college group where a member of the administration was seen encouraging students to support the university by countering backlash with positive posts about the university.

In response, the university released a statement refuting the charges of harassment and against their policy on malpractice during examinations. Expressing regret, the statement claimed that Aditya was escorted for carrying a mobile phone with material related to the examination and that he was counselled to stay calm and would be given the opportunity to explain his side of the story before he left the room. It went on to refute "all charges that are being made regarding the process and all the lies that are being circulated by opinions on our staff and the welfare of our students". Three members of the faculty, who were present with Aditya were later charged with abetting suicide.

On October 28, 2023: Another case of student suicide was reported at PES University. Surya M Achar, a third-year student pursuing B.Tech. Computer Science from the Electronic City branch of PES University ended his life by jumping from the college building.

=== 2020 suicides ===
==== January 30, 2020 incident ====
On 30 January 2020, an employee was found dead in a second-floor washroom of the Arcade building in J. P. Nagar, next to Le Arabia. The deceased was identified as Kavitha K, a 20-year-old. The reason for the suicide remains unknown.

==== May 14, 2024 incident ====
On May 14, 2024, another student suicide occurred at the same campus, marking the fourth student death at the university. The student, identified as Carasala Rahul, a 21-year-old B.Tech. student, died after jumping off the fourth floor of a campus building. PES University responded to the incident, stating that Rahul, who had an excellent academic record, arrived on campus but did not enter the exam hall. The university emphasized its cooperation with the authorities, providing access to information and surveillance footage to assist in the investigation.

An anonymous social media post alleged that Rahul was barred from taking his exam due because he was late and the management warned him he would get a backlog. The post stated: “The suicide today has been confirmed, it was no accident. The student was a third-year student whose exam was at 8:30. He arrived at 9 and was not allowed to write the end-semester exam. He was even told he would get a backlog and wouldn't be able to sit for placements."

==== Investigation and response ====
In light of these incidents, the University Grants Commission (UGC) has requested the chief secretary to investigate the suicides at PES University. A police officer stated, "We are talking to students to understand if the management is going hard on them and if there is any academic pressure. Three suicide cases in a row is a matter of grave concern.”
