= Waiting for a Visa =

Book by Dr.B. R. Ambedkar

- Author: B. R. Ambedkar
- Language: English
- Publisher: People's Education Society
- Publication date: 19 March 1990
- Publication place: India
- ISBN: 978-9-354-20634-4

Waiting for a Visa is an unfinished autobiographical document written by B. R. Ambedkar during the period of 1935–36. The manuscript was published as a booklet, posthumously, on 19 March 1990, by the People's Education Society. The composition comprises a collection of anecdotes from Ambedkar himself and other individuals, intended to exemplify the practice of untouchability in Indian society.

== Contents ==
The book consists of a brief introductory passage followed by six sections relating Ambedkar's experiences with untouchability, starting from his childhood. Sections 1, 2, 3 and 4 consist of Ambedkar's own experiences, while Sections 5 and 6 mainly consist of first-hand accounts of other people's experiences with untouchability, presented by Ambedkar.

=== Introduction ===
In a single-paragraph introduction, Ambedkar introduces the theme of the book, primarily aimed at foreigners and those who may not be familiar with the concept of untouchability.

=== Section 1: A childhood journey to Goregaon becomes a nightmare ===
The first section describes a trip undertaken in 1901 by nine-year-old Ambedkar and his siblings from their residence in Satara to Goregaon to meet their father, and the discriminatory behavior they encounter along the way, making their journey appear impossible and dangerous. Additionally, Ambedkar recalls the discrimination he faced in school, such as being required to sit on a separate piece of gunny cloth—which he was required to bring home with him—and requiring the presence of a school peon in order to drink water; both of these measures were taken by the school to ensure the ground and water weren't "polluted", respectively, by an untouchable. He describes the water situation with the phrase, "no peon, no water".

=== Section 2: Back from the west, and unable to find lodging in Baroda ===
This section primarily describes the deep divides that existed in Baroda during the period, not only between castes, but also between religions. In 1918, upon returning to India—after spending three years in the United States and a year in London—Ambedkar went to Baroda state to work as a probationer in the Accountant General's Office. However, upon arriving in Baroda, he found that none of the Hindu hotels would allow him to stay due to his lower caste, something that he had largely grown unaccustomed to due to his time abroad. He eventually found a Parsi inn; however, non-Parsis were not allowed to stay. Ambedkar negotiated a compromise with the inn-keeper, proposing to register with a false Parsi name. The inn-keeper agreed, and Ambedkar was allowed to stay; however, this was eventually discovered by other Parsis on the eleventh day of Ambedkar's stay, when a group of angry Parsi men, armed with sticks, arrived to remove him from the inn. After issuing a barrage of questions and threatening remarks, the Parsi men told Ambedkar that he was to leave that same day by the evening.

Dismayed, Ambedkar left and attempted to find temporary shelter elsewhere until his application to the Minister for a bungalow was answered. His only two friends in the area were a Hindu and an Indian Christian, but both indirectly rejected Ambedkar's requests due to his lower caste: the former stated to Ambedkar that “If you come to my home my servants will go”, and the latter insinuated that his Brahmin wife would not consent to harbouring an untouchable in her house. Ambedkar, seeing no other option, left Baroda and returned to Bombay, and concludes the section by stating, "It was then for the first time that I learnt that a person who is an untouchable to a Hindu is also an untouchable to a Parsi."

=== Section 3: Pride, awkwardness and a dangerous accident in Chalisgaon ===
In this section, Ambedkar recounts an accident that occurred to him in the village of Chalisgaon (Maharashtra) in 1929. He had been appointed as a member to a committee instituted by the Bombay government to investigate allegations of oppression and grievances of untouchables. After carrying out investigations in the district of Khandesh, en route to Bombay, he disembarked at Chalisgaon to investigate a case of social boycott by Hindus against untouchables of that village. The untouchables of the village requested him to spend the night with them, but as the "tonga walas" (one-horse carriage drivers) considered it below their dignity to cart an untouchable, the villagers were forced to hire a carriage and drive it themselves, which they proceeded to do; however, the untouchable driving the carriage was inexperienced, and consequently caused an accident: as the carriage was crossing the river on a culvert, a wheel became stuck between the stones, causing the horse and carriage to fall into the river; Ambedkar was thrown off the carriage onto the pavement, sustaining multiple injuries, such as a leg fracture.

Ambedkar, recounting this episode, states that the pride and dignity of the village untouchables (due to their unwillingness to bring their guest on foot) led them take unnecessary risks regarding the safety of the passenger. Ambedkar also reflects on the fact that even menial Tonga walas inherently felt that a highly educated barrister at law was below them due to his status as an untouchable.

=== Section 4: Polluting the water in the fort of Daulatabad ===
This section relates to an incident that serves to illustrate Indian Muslims invariably retaining the same prejudice against untouchables as Hindus.

In 1934, Ambedkar and a group of his friends had gone to visit Daulatabad fort during a trip to Aurangabad (then in the Nizam state of Hyderabad). Upon arriving at the fort, Ambedkar and his friends washed themselves with water kept in a tank at the fort entrance, due to dust having gathered on them during the journey. However, after a few minutes, a Mohammedan began to run towards them, shouting, "the Dheds (untouchables) have polluted our water!", consequently causing a commotion; a large group of Muslims eventually accumulated and began directing loud abuse towards both Ambedkar's group for "polluting" the water, and the local untouchable community for allowing them to do so. Ambedkar writes, "They [the Mohammedans] the kept on abusing them and us. The abuse was so vulgar that it had exasperated us."

Ambedkar reflects on this episode at the end of the chapter, stating, ''I gave one instance to show that a person who is an untouchable to a Hindu is also an untouchable to a Parsi. This will show that a person who is an untouchable to a Hindu is also an untouchable to a Mohammedan.''

=== Section 5: A doctor refuses to give proper care and a woman dies. ===
In this section Ambedkar presents a letter published in Young India, a journal by M.K.Gandhi, in its 12 December 1929 issue. The letter is written by a Harijan schoolteacher in Kathiawar, whose wife fell sick soon after giving birth to a child. The local doctor (who was a Hindu (Brahmin)) refused to treat her directly, or even enter into their village, due to their low-caste status. The doctor eventually agreed to see the ill woman, but only on the condition that she was brought outside the Harijan colony and diagnosed and treated without physical contact. The schoolteacher assented to this, and the process was carried out, in which the doctor first passed the thermometer to a Muslim, who passed it to the schoolteacher, who passed it to his wife. The doctor diagnosed the wife with pneumonia and left. Over the course of the next few days, the wife's condition worsened, and the doctor refused to return, despite the schoolteacher paying the fee. The schoolteacher's wife eventually died due to a lack of sufficient care.

Ambedkar concludes the chapter, stating, "He [the doctor] felt no qualms of conscience in setting aside the code of conduct which is binding on his profession. The Hindu would prefer to be inhuman rather than touch an Untouchable."

=== Section 6: A young clerk is abused and threatened until he gives up his job ===
In this section, Ambedkar presents the narrated experience of a young man in Bhangi who was employed as a Talati in the government district offices of Borsad, Kheda, in what is now Gujarat. However, due to the man's status as an untouchable, he was refused accommodation at the office. The untouchables of the village also did not accommodate or help him, as they feared the resentful upper-caste Hindus who felt that the man had taken a job that was beyond his natural rights.

At the government office, his colleagues discriminated against him in numerous ways, treated him poorly, and did not allow him to drink water. Ultimately, the situation exacerbated, and an incident prompted a mob of locals to threaten to kill him. The man, distraught, immediately vacated his job position.

== First publication and later editions ==
In 1990, the People's Education Society published this work as a booklet. It was subsequently published by the Education Department, Government of Maharashtra in 1993, in Dr. Babasaheb Ambedkar: Writings and Speeches, Vol. 12, Part I.

== See also ==
- B. R. Ambedkar bibliography
