= Becoming Babasaheb: The Life =

2023 book on B. R. Ambedkar

Becoming Babasaheb: The Life and Times of Bhimrao Ramji Ambedkar
- Author: Aakash Singh Rathore
- Language: English
- Publisher: HarperCollins
- Publication date: 13 April 2023
- Publication place: India
- Media type: Print (hardback)
- Pages: 273
- ISBN: 978-9356991224

Becoming Babasaheb: The Life and Times of Bhimrao Ramji Ambedkar is a book about B. R. Ambedkar written by Aakash Singh Rathore. The first of an ambitious two-volume biography, Becoming Babasaheb traces Ambedkar's life journey, from his birth in 1891 to the transformative Mahad Satyagraha in 1929. It was published on 13 April 2023 by HarperCollins.

== Critical reception ==
Uma Mahadevan-Dasgupta of The Hindu wrote "Every day, in the 21st century, the life of this tremendous intellectual and activist continues to be an inspiration to all those who care for social justice and equality". A Critic of The Tribune says "Rathore’s book refreshingly restarts and re-discovers Ambedkar. It gives us a panoramic-cinematic view and this addition of a newer version on Ambedkar’s life is always a must-read". Pratul Sharma of The Week wrote "The biography will enlighten the new and young readers amid renewed interest in Ambedkar, and of course those politically and ideologically inclined, and the academic researchers who have been missing out on the crucial details while referring to the older biographies".
