= Joothan =

Autobiographical novel by Om Prakash Valmiki

Joothan: An Untouchable's Life
- Author: Omprakash Valmiki
- Original title: Joothan
- Translator: Arun Prabha Mukherjee
- Language: English (translated from Hindi)
- Genre: Memoir
- Published: c. 1997 (Hindi)
- Publisher: Columbia University Press
- English publication date: July 2003
- Media type: Print (hardcover, paperback), e-book
- Pages: 208
- ISBN: 9780231129725
- Website: https://cup.columbia.edu/book/joothan/9780231129732/

Joothan: An Untouchable's Life, or Joothan: A Dalit's Life, is an autobiographical memoir by Indian Dalit writer Omprakash Valmiki. First published in 1997 in Hindi, it was translated to English language by Arun Prabha Mukherjee in 2003. The book describes his life as a Dalit, previously known as 'untouchables,' and their experience of pain, humiliation, and poverty through systemic caste-based discrimination. The title of the book is derived from Hindi word जूठन referring to 'scraps of food left on a plate, destined for garbage or animals,' that the lower caste was forced to survive on for centuries.

== Synopsis ==
The text chronicles the journey of Om Prakash Valmiki, a Dalit who overcomes caste-based humiliation and poverty to become his village's first educated member of the Dalit community. The story is set in 1950s of post-independence India, where untouchability has just been outlawed. Beginning with scenes of dire sanitation and relentless harassment, Valmiki's narrative traces his adolescence marked by religious skepticism and public shame upon revealing his caste. His vocational training and discovery of Dalit activism, notably the influence of B. R. Ambedkar, ignite his commitment to social change. Valmiki challenges inherited caste stigma through merit-based achievements and government employment, dedicating himself to uplifting others via cultural engagement and educational outreach, such as drama productions and opening schools. His memoir emphasizes the struggle for a self-defined identity and collective empowerment of Dalits.
