= Annihilation of Caste =

Book by Dr B. R. Ambedkar

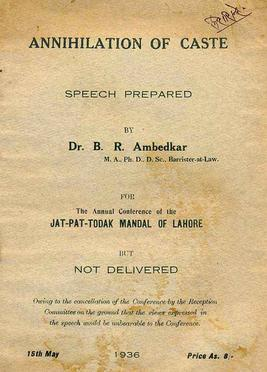
- Cover of the first edition
- Author: B. R. Ambedkar
- Language: English
- Publication date: 1936
- Publication place: India
- ISBN: 978-8189059637
- OCLC: 498680197

Annihilation of Caste is an undelivered speech written by B. R. Ambedkar in 1936. The speech was intended to be delivered at an anti-caste convention held in Lahore by Hindu reformers. However, upon reviewing the written speech, the conference organisers deemed it too controversial, quite lengthy and subsequently revoked Ambedkar's invitation to the conference. Ambedkar proceeded to self-publish the speech, which gained widespread popularity and prompted translations into multiple Indian languages. Since then this speech has been viewed as a manifesto for the abolition of caste system and for social emancipation.

== Background ==
In a letter dated 12 December 1935, the secretary of the Jat-Pat Todak Mandal (Society for the Break Up of Caste system), an anti-caste Hindu reformist organization based in Lahore, invited Dr.Ambedkar to deliver a speech on the caste system in India at their annual conference in 1936. Ambedkar wrote the speech as an essay under the title "Annihilation of Caste" and sent in advance to the organisers in Lahore for printing and distribution. The organisers found some of the content to be objectionable towards the orthodox Hindu religion, so intemperate in the idiom and vocabulary used, and so incendiary in promoting conversion away from Hinduism, that they sought the deletion of large sections of the more controversial content endangering Brahmanical interests. They wrote to Ambedkar seeking the removal of sections which they found, in their words, "unbearable." Ambedkar declared in response that he "would not change a comma" of his text. After much deliberation, the committee of organisers decided to cancel their annual conference in its entirety. Ambedkar subsequently published 1500 copies of the speech as a book on 15 May 1936 at his own expense as Jat-Pat Todak Mandal failed to fulfill their word.

== Overview ==
The book focuses on the urgent need for social reform to take precedence over political and religious reform in Indian society. Ambedkar meticulously exposes the tyranny imposed by upper-caste Hindus on the untouchable community, providing instances of discrimination and advocating for the reconstruction of Hindu society. He challenges the fallacy of socialist ideals in the context of India, asserting that a socialist revolution is unattainable as long as the caste system persists.

In the essay, Ambedkar criticised the Hindu religion, its caste system and its religious texts which are male dominant and spreading hatred and suppression of female interests. Ambedkar's central argument revolves around the detrimental impact of caste on ethics, morality, and public spirit within Hindu society. He rejects traditional defenses of caste based on the division of labor, purity of blood, and historical legitimacy. Instead, he argues that caste is a divisive force, creating a hierarchy that impedes social cohesion.

He argued that inter-caste dining and inter-caste marriage is not sufficient to annihilate the caste system, but that "the real method of breaking up the Caste System was... to destroy the religious notions upon which caste is founded".

== Core Arguments ==
“The enemy, you must grapple with, is not the people who observe Caste, but the Shastras which teach them this religion of Caste.”

“Breaking up the Caste System was not to bring about inter-caste dinners and inter-caste marriages but to destroy the religious notions on which Caste was founded.”

“There cannot be a more degrading system of social organization than the Chaturvarnya. It is the system which deadens, paralyses and cripples the people from helpful activity.”

“The effect of caste on the ethics of the Hindus is simply deplorable. Caste has killed public spirit. Caste has destroyed the sense of public charity. Caste has made public opinion impossible.”

Ambedkar critically examines the caste system, arguing against its defense based on the division of labor. He contends that caste is not merely a division of labor but a division of laborers, leading to forced occupation, job aversion, and inefficiency. The book questions the scientific basis of caste and highlights the dehumanising impact of Hindu Dharmashastras, particularly the Manusmriti.

The ethical and moral ramifications of the caste system are central to Ambedkar's critique. He laments the destruction of public spirit, charity, and opinion within Hindu society, asserting that caste loyalty supersedes broader ethical considerations. The work emphasises the caste system's obstruction of associated corporate life and its detrimental effect on virtue and morality.

=== Division of Labour ===
Ambedkar rejects the defense of caste based on the division of labour, arguing that it is not a voluntary division based on choice and aptitude but an involuntary and forced categorization that leads to inefficiency.

=== Purity of Blood Myth ===
He disputes the idea of purity of blood within castes, emphasising the historical admixture of foreign elements in various classes and castes.

=== Caste as a Social Hierarchy ===
Ambedkar describes Hindu society as a collection of castes with a graded hierarchy, making an associated life virtually impossible.

=== Ethics and Morality ===
He contends that caste destroys the concept of ethics and morality, leading to a lack of public spirit and charity. Virtue becomes caste-ridden, and morality becomes caste-bound.

== Solutions Proposed ==
Ambedkar proposes two primary solutions to abolish the caste system: inter-caste marriages and the destruction of religious scriptures, including the Vedas and Puranas. He argues that opposition to inter-caste marriages stems from a fear of losing social and political power. The call for the destruction of religious scriptures is grounded in his belief that they perpetuate social injustice.

== Mahatma Gandhi's response ==
In July 1936, Gandhi wrote articles under the title "A Vindication Of Caste" in his weekly journal (Harijans) in which he made comments on Ambedkar's address. He defended the right of Ambedkar to deliver his speech and condemned the Jat-Pat-Todak Mandal for rejecting the President of its choice because the Mandal already knew Ambedkar was a staunch critic of Hinduism and the caste system.

Gandhi, however, accused Ambedkar of selecting the wrong interpretations of the Shastras. Gandhi argued that the Shastras selected by Ambedkar cannot be accepted as the word of God and cannot be accepted as authentic. He also argued that religion should be judged by the very best, not the worst, adherents of the religion, and that the standard set by Ambedkar would fail every known living faith.

== Later editions and translations ==
In the second edition of his book, Ambedkar replied to Gandhi's comments. This edition was published in 1937 as Annihilation of Caste: With a Reply to Mahatma Gandhi. He published a third edition in 1944; it included another essay, Castes in India: Their Mechanism, Genesis and Development, which had been presented at a seminar in New York in 1916.

In 2014, an annotated edition was released by Navayana, a New Delhi–based publishing house, with an introduction by Arundhati Roy titled "The Doctor and the Saint".

Annihilation of Caste was translated into Tamil with the help of Periyar and published in 1937. Segments were continuously published in the rationalist Tamil magazine Kudi Arasu.

== See also ==
- B. R. Ambedkar bibliography
- Who Were the Shudras?
- Dalit
