= Bahishkrit Hitakarini Sabha =

Indian organisation founded by B R Ambedkar (1924–1928)

- Abbreviation: BHS
- Formation: 20 July 1924
- Founder: B. R. Ambedkar
- Founded at: Bombay, British India
- Type: Social reform organization
- Legal status: Dissolved (14 June 1928)
- Purpose: Upliftment of Dalits, social and educational reforms
- Headquarters: Damodar Hall, Bombay
- Chairman: B. R. Ambedkar
- Key people: Chimanlal Harilal Setalvad (president) B. G. Kher (solicitor)

Bahishkrit Hitakarini Sabha, also referred to as the Depressed Classes Institute was an organisation formed by Dr. B. R. Ambedkar on 20 July 1924 in Bombay, driven by the goal of improving the educational standards for Untouchables and address their socio-political challenges. The founding principles of the Sabha were expressed in their motto; "educate, organize and agitate".

== History ==
In March 1924, Dr. B.R. Ambedkar initiated efforts to launch a social movement aimed at the upliftment of the Untouchables. On 9 March 1924, a meeting was convened at Damodar Hall in Bombay to discuss the need for establishing a central organization that would address the issues faced by the Untouchables and present their grievances to the government. After extensive discussions, it was resolved to form such an institution, which was subsequently founded on July 20, 1924, under the name Bahishkrit Hitakarini Sabha. The Sabha was officially registered under the Indian Societies Registration Act XXI of 1860.

The objectives of the Sabha were as follows:

- To promote the spread of education among the Depressed Classes by opening hostels and other necessary means.
- To encourage the dissemination of culture within Depressed Class study circles.
- To improve the economic conditions of the Depressed Classes by establishing industrial and agricultural schools.

=== Members ===
- Sri Chimanlal Harilal Setalvad - The President of the Bahishkrit Hitakarini Sabha
- Meyer Nissim - Vice-President
- J.P. - Vice-President
- Rustomji Jinwala - Vice-President
- G.K. Nariman - Solicitor
- Dr. R.P. Paranjpye - Solicitor
- Dr. V.P. Chavan - Solicitor
- B. G. Kher - Solicitor
- Dr.B.R.Ambedkar - The Chairman of the managing committee
- S.N. Shivtarkar - Secretary
- N.T.Jadhav - Treasure

== Works ==
The Bahishkrit Hitakarini Sabha was established to address the educational needs of the Depressed Classes. On January 4, 1925, the Sabha initiated a hostel in Sholapur to provide accommodation for high school students from these communities.

== See also ==
- Hitkarini Sabha
