= Ramji Sakpal =

Social activist and father of B. R. Ambedkar (1848–1913)

Ramji Maloji Sakpal
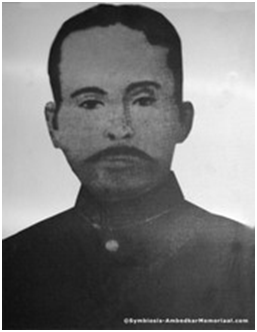
- Born: 1848
- Died: February 2, 1913 (aged 64); Mumbai
- Occupations: Soldiers, military teachers
- Spouse(s): Bhimabai Sakpal, Jijabai Sakpal
- Children: Anand, B. R. Ambedkar, Balram, Ganga, Manjula, Tulsa
- Father: Maloji Sakpal

Ramji Sakpal (1848–1913), popularly known as Ramji Ambedkar, was a 'Subhedar' in the British Indian Army. He was fluent in English and also served as a teacher to the British Indian Army. Ramji Ambedkar was the father of Dr. Babasaheb Ambedkar. In extremely adverse circumstances, Ramji Maloji Ambedkar endured hardships to complete Bhimrao's education. Ramji Ambedkar wanted Bhimrao to get higher education.

== Life ==
Ramji was the father of B. R. Ambedkar. Ramji's father Maloji had joined the British royal army as a soldier. Due to his service in the army, Maloji Rao was able to study in a military school. He had taken initiation into the Ramananda sect. Therefore, pure thoughts and pure conduct played an important role in Maloji Rao's household affairs. Maloji Rao had four children, three sons and a daughter. After two sons, the daughter Mirabai was born. Ramji, born around 1848, was Maloji Rao's fourth child. Maloji Rao's first son abandoned his family and became a monk. The second son joined the British army. The third son, Ramji, studied in a military school and later passed the normal examination. While studying, Ramji was enrolled as a soldier in the 106th Sappers and Miners Battalion of the British Army around 1866 at the age of 18. When Ramji was 19 years old, he married 13-year-old Bhimabai. Bhimabai's father was a resident of Murbad and was a Subedar in the British army. Ramji was religious. He recited the couplets of Saint Kabir, the Abhangs of saints like Dnyaneshwar, Namdev, Chokhoba, Eknath, Tukaram etc. He used to read Dnyaneshwari every day and also recited Strophes and Bhupalya in the morning. While he was a soldier in the army, his English education started in the military school and he mastered English very well. Due to this, he passed the Normal School (matriculation) examination. After passing the matriculation examination, he got a job as a soldier and was promoted to the post of teacher in the military school i.e. 'Normal School'. Ramji was admitted to the Military School in Pune to get training to provide better education. After becoming a trained teacher, he was promoted to the Military School of the British Raj and became the headmaster and remained in this position for fourteen years. He was also promoted to the post of 'Subhedar' during the final phase of his tenure as headmaster. Ramji and Bhimabai had fourteen children by 1891. Of these, four daughters, Ganga, Rama, Manjula and Tulsa, were still alive. Of the sons, three sons, Balaram, Anandrao and Bhimrao (Bhiwa), were still alive. Bhimrao was the youngest and fourteenth child.

The battalion in which Ramji was stationed arrived at the military base in Mhow , Madhya Pradesh, in 1888. Here, Subedar Ramji was appointed as the headmaster of the Normal School. During this period, on 14 April 1891, Dr. Babasaheb Ambedkar was born to Ramji and Bhimabai in the military cantonment village of Mhow (now Dr. Ambedkar Nagar ). Ramji also received formal education in Marathi and English. Bhimrao was the 14th and last child of Ramji Sakpal and his mother Bhimabai.

== Sources ==
- Gaikwad Rajvansh, Dr. Dnyanraj (2024). Mahamnav Dr. Bhimrao Ramji. Kolapur: Riya Prakashan. ISBN 978-9358135183.
