= Castes in India: Their Mechanism, Genesis and Development =

1917 book by B. R. Ambedkar

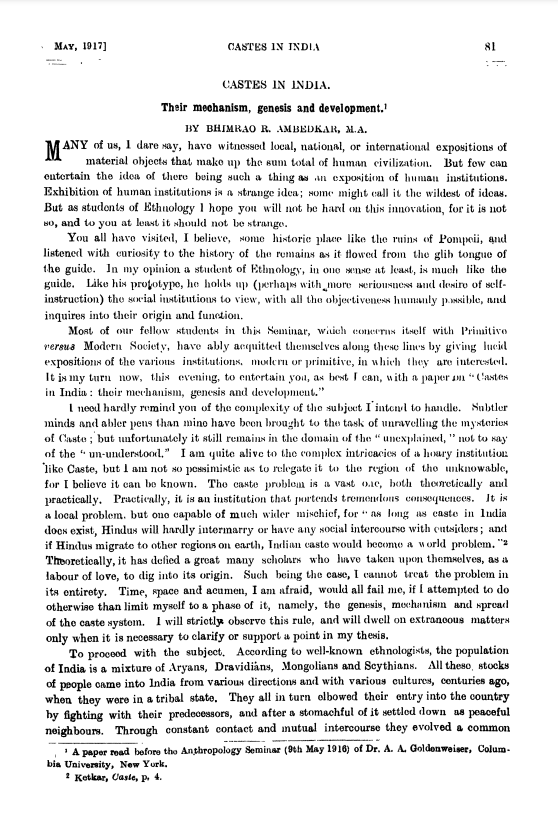
- First page of Castes in India as originally published in The Indian Antiquary in May 1917
- Author: B. R. Ambedkar
- Language: English
- Genre: Scholarly paper
- Publisher: The Indian Antiquary
- Publication date: May 1917
- Publication place: India
- ISBN: 9781982085346
- Text: Castes in India: Their Mechanism, Genesis and Development at Wikisource

Castes in India: Their Mechanism, Genesis and Development was a paper read by B. R. Ambedkar at an anthropological seminar of Alexander Goldenweiser in New York on 9 May 1916. It was later published in volume XLVI of Indian Antiquary in May 1917. In the same year, Ambedkar was awarded a PhD degree by Columbia University on this topic. In 1979, the Education Department of the Government of Maharashtra (Bombay) published this article in the collection of Ambedkar's writings and speeches Volume 1; later, it was translated in many languages.

In the paper, Ambedkar made a presentation a social phenomenon that emerged from the strategy of the Brahmins who adopted a strictly endogamous matrimonial regime, leading the other groups to do the same in order to emulate this self-proclaimed elite. He said that "the superposition of endogamy on exogamy means the creation of caste".

== Exordium ==
Ambedkar presented his paper "Castes in India: Their Mechanism, Genesis and Development" at an anthropology seminar, in which he started with the following statement:

I need hardly remind you of the complexity of the subject I intend to handle. Subtler minds and abler pens than mine have been brought to the task of unravelling the mysteries of Caste; but unfortunately it still remains in the domain of the "unexplained," not to say of the "un-understood." I am quite alive to the complex intricacies of a hoary institution like Caste, but I am not so pessimistic as to relegate it to the region of the unknowable, for I believe it can be known. The caste problem is a vast one, both theoretically and practically. Practically, it is an institution that portends tremendous consequences. It is a local problem, but one capable of much wider mischief, for "as long as caste in India does exist, Hindus will hardly intermarry or have any social intercourse with outsiders; and if Hindus migrate to other regions on earth, Indian caste would become a world problem." Theoretically, it has defied a great many scholars who have taken upon themselves, as a labour of love, to dig into its origin. Such being the case, I cannot treat the problem in its entirety. Time, space and acumen, I am afraid, would all fail me, if I attempted to do otherwise than limit myself to a phase of it, namely, the genesis, mechanism and spread of the caste system. I will strictly observe this rule, and will dwell on extraneous matters only when it is necessary to clarify or support a point in my thesis.

== Genesis ==
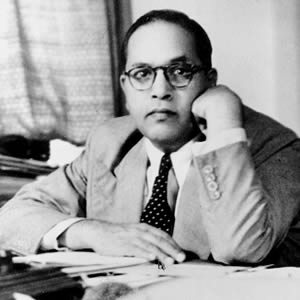
B. R. Ambedkar in 1918

Ambedkar believed that ethnically, all people are heterogeneous. According to him, the Indian Peninsula has not only a geographic unity, but also a deeper and a much more fundamental cultural unity. The unity of culture is the basis of homogeneity, which makes the problem of caste difficult to be explained. If the Hindu society were a mere federation of mutually exclusive units, the matter would be simple enough. But, the caste is a "parcelling" of an already homogeneous unit, and the explanation of the genesis of caste is the explanation of this process of parcelling.

Ambedkar views that definitions of castes given by Émile Senart John Nesfield, H. H. Risley and Dr Ketkar as incomplete or incorrect by itself and all have missed the central point in the mechanism of the caste system. Senart's "idea of pollution" is a characteristic of caste in so far as caste has a religious flavour. Nesfield states that 'absence of messing' with those outside the Caste is one of its characteristics, but Nesfield has mistaken the effect for the cause, as caste is a closed group that naturally limits all social intercourse outside of one's caste, including messing etc. Risley makes no new point that deserves special attention. Dr. Ambedkar elucidates that Ketkar's definition of "prohibition of intermarriage" and "membership by autogeny" as two characteristics of caste are two aspects of one and the same thing but not two different things. The prohibition of intermarriage means limiting membership to those born within the group.

Ambedkar has evaluated that the endogamy (absence of intermarriage) is the only one that can be called the essence of caste and only characteristic that is peculiar to caste. No civilized society of today presents more survivals of primitive times than does the Indian society like the custom of exogamy. The creed of exogamy, is not that sapindas (blood-kins) cannot marry, but a marriage between sagotras (gotras or clans of the same class) is regarded as a sacrilege. In spite of the endogamy of the castes within them, exogamy is strictly observed and that there are more rigorous penalties for violating exogamy than there are for violating endogamy. Thus "the Superposition of endogamy on exogamy means the creation of caste."

== Mechanism ==
Ambedkar views that sati, enforced widowhood, and child marriage are customs that were primarily intended to solve the problem of the surplus woman and surplus man (widower) in a caste, and to maintain its endogamy. Strict endogamy could not be preserved without these customs, while caste without endogamy is fake.

According to Amebdkar, the two customs—Sati (burning of the widow on the funeral pyre of her deceased husband) and enforced widowhood (not allowing a widow to remarry) -- intended to solve the problem of surplus women. Whereas man has had the upper hand compared to woman and is a dominant figure with greater prestige in every group. Woman, on the other hand, has been an easy prey to all kinds of iniquitous injunctions, religious, social, or economic. Such being the case, one cannot accord the same kind of treatment to a surplus man as you can to a surplus woman in a caste. So "Girl Marriage" was the only custom intended to solve the problem of the surplus man (widower).

== Origin or Development ==
Ambedkar believed that the "Origin of Caste" was synonymous with "the Origin of the Mechanism for Endogamy" and he treated class and caste as neighbours, saying that "a caste is an Enclosed Class".

For him, the "father" of the institution of caste could be the Brahmins who adopted a strictly endogamous matrimonial regime, leading other groups to do the same to emulate this self-proclaimed elite. The priestly class in all ancient civilizations are the originators of this "unnatural Institution" founded and maintained through unnatural means.

== See also ==
- B. R. Ambedkar bibliography
  - Annihilation of Caste (1936)
  - Who Were the Shudras? (1946)
- Dalit
