= Chandramohan S =

Indian poet

Chandramohan Sathyanathan (born c. 1988) is an Indian poet. He resides in Thiruvananthapuram and has primarily been part of the contemporary Indian English poetry scene. He trained as an engineer. Chandramohan's poetry covers a range of themes, with a particular emphasis on issues related to caste discrimination, gender surveillance, and political activism. His poems often draw inspiration from historical events and contemporary movements, providing a unique perspective on the marginalized.

One of Chandramohan's notable poems, "Killing Shambuka," draws parallels between the discrimination faced by Dalit students in higher education institutions and the myth of Shambuka. Another poem, "Love in the Time of CCTV-I," critiques the surveillance society and its impact on personal relationships. In 2016, Outlook Magazine listed him as the Dalit Achiever of the Year, acknowledging his efforts in promoting subaltern cultural awareness in Kerala. He is also a part of the P. K. Rosi Foundation (after the pioneering Dalit actress P. K. Rosi).

== Poetry collections and awards ==
Chandramohan is the author of several poetry collections, including "Warscape Verses" (2014), "Love after Babel" which won the Nicholas Guillen Outstanding book award (2020) from the Caribbean Philosophical Association and "Letters to Namdeo Dhasal" (2016). The latter was shortlisted for prestigious literary prizes such as the Srinivas Rayaprol Poetry Prize and the Harish Govind Memorial Prize. Both Love after Babel and Letters to Namdeo Dhasal were shortlisted for the Yuva Puraskar of the Sahitya Akademi, New Delhi.
