= Omprakash Valmiki =

Indian writer (1950-2013)

- Born: Omprakash singh 30 June 1950; Muzaffarnagar, Uttar Pradesh, India
- Died: 17 November 2013 (aged 63); Dehradun, Uttarakhand, India
- Occupations: Writer, poet
- Spouse: Chanda Khairwal
- Writing career
- Genre: autobiography

Omprakash Valmiki (30 June 1950 – 17 November 2013) was an Indian writer and poet. Well known for his autobiography, Joothan, considered a milestone in Dalit literature. He was born at the village of Barla in the Muzzafarnagar district of Uttar Pradesh. After retirement from Government Ordnance Factory he lived in Dehradun where he died of complications arising out of stomach cancer on 17 November 2013.

Besides Jootan (his biography) (1997), Valmiki published three collections of poetry: Sadiyon Ka Santaap (1989), Bas! Bahut Ho Chuka (1997), and Ab Aur Nahin (2009). He also wrote two collections of short stories, Salaam (2000), and Ghuspethiye (2004). In addition, he wrote Dalit Sahitya Ka Saundaryshaastra (2001) and a history of the Valmiki community, Safai Devata (2009), Do Chera' (a play). His 15 short stories have been translated into English by Naresh K. Jain for the collection Amma and Other Stories in 2008.
