= People's Education Society =

- Abbreviation: PES
- Formation: October 11, 1972 (53 years ago)
- Founder: Dr. M. R. Doreswamy
- Location: Bangalore, India
- Website: https://pes.edu

People's Education Society (PES) was founded in 1972 with just over 40 students in a rented gymnasium in Bangalore, Karnataka. Today, PES has more than 18,000 students spread across multiple campuses in Karnataka and Andhra Pradesh.

== History ==
People's Education Society (PES) was established under Mysore Societies Registration Act 1960 (Mysore Act No. 17 of 1960) on October 11, 1972, and was founded by Dr. M. R. Doreswamy.

== Mission statement ==
=== Mission ===
To provide students with a sense of history, an understanding of values and ethics, a commitment to law and morality, an appreciation of human creativity and an analytical inquiring mind.

=== Vision ===
To create professionally superior and ethically strong global workforce.

=== Quality policy ===
To develop highly skilled human resources with the ability to adapt to an intellectually and technologically changing environment with the participative efforts of the management, staff, students and parents.

== Educational institutions ==
PES is currently running the following educational institutions.

Name of Institution	Type	Year of Establishment	Location
PES Pre-University College of Commerce & Science	Pre-University	1972	Bangalore, Karnataka
PES University, Hanumantha Nagar Campus formed by the merger of *PES College of Pharmacy (established 1980); *PES Degree College (established 1982)	University	2018	Bangalore, Karnataka
PES Polytechnic	Diploma	1983	Bangalore, Karnataka
PES University, Ring Road Campus	University	1988	Bangalore, Karnataka
PES Institute of Medical Sciences and Research (PESMSR)	Medical college	2002	Kuppam, Andhra Pradesh
PES University, Electronic City Campus	University	2005	Bangalore, Karnataka
The Aamartra Academy	High School	2012	Bangalore, Karnataka
PES Public School	School	2014	Chittoor, Andhra Pradesh
S.S.M Public School	School	1958	Bangalore, Karnataka
