= Dalit Kitchens of Marathwada =

2024 non-fiction book

- Author: Shahu Patole
- Original title: 'Anna He Apoorna Brahma'
- Translator: Bhushan Korgaonkar
- Language: English (translation); originally Marathi
- Subject: Dalit foodways, caste and cuisine, regional culinary history
- Genre: Cookbook/memoir/food writing/ethnography
- Publisher: HarperCollins India
- Publication date: 2024
- Publication place: India
- Pages: 386

Dalit Kitchens of Marathwada is a 2024 book by Shahu Patole, translated into English by Bhushan Korgaonkar and published by HarperCollins India. The book documents the food practices, recipes, and culinary histories of Dalit communities (notably the Mahar and Mang communities) in the Marathwada region of Maharashtra, and interweaves recipes with memoir, ethnographic detail and critique of caste-based exclusion in Indian culinary history.

== Background ==
The book was first published in Marathi under the title Anna He Apoorna Brahma and later translated into English by Bhushan Korgaonkar. Patole — a Marathi-language writer — compiled recipes, oral histories and reflections to record culinary practices that have historically been marginalized in mainstream representations of Indian food.

== Contents ==
The book combines recipes with personal recollections and social analysis. Chapters cover regional breads (jowar/bajra rotis), vegetable preparations, meats (including offal and sacrificial meat practices), kitchen tools, rituals, and the ways caste shapes access to ingredients and notions of purity. Patole frames these foodways as acts of resilience and community memory rather than culinary curiosities.

== Reception ==
The book received attention from mainstream Indian press and specialist reviewers. Suraj Yengde (Hindustan Times) praised its combination of dietary history, recipes and social record, calling it "excellent and very engaging" and noting the importance of documenting Dalit culinary traditions.

The India Forum reviewer described the book as an ethnographic account that uses the cookbook form to archive Dalit life, food rituals and the social structures that shape them.

Business Standard published a feature/review highlighting the book's interrogation of how caste shapes the culinary canon and observed the work's significance in broadening public understanding of neglected food traditions.

Academic and specialist reviews also discussed the book's importance; for example, a review in Gastronomica positioned it as notable for its contribution to food studies and the documentation of marginalized culinary practices.

== Significance ==
Commentators have noted that Dalit Kitchens of Marathwada fills a gap in the published record by centering Dalit food histories and challenging Brahminical and mainstream exclusions in the culinary imagination. Reviewers have emphasized the book’s role as both cultural archive and political commentary on food and caste.

== See also ==
- Cuisine of Maharashtra
- Dalit literature
