= Kalyani Thakur Charal =

Indian Dalit poet and feminist

- Born: 1965 (age 60–61); Bagula, Nadia district, West Bengal, India
- Education: Bachelor's degree in Commerce
- Occupations: Poet; writer; editor
- Writing career
- Notable works: Chandalinir Kabita; Chandalini Bhone; Chandalinir Bibriti; Ami Keno Charal Likhi
- Notable awards: SPARROW Literary Award (2017)
- Movement: Dalit feminism

Kalyani Thakur Charal (born 1965) is a Dalit feminist poet from India writing in the Bengali language.

== Early life and education ==
Charal was born in Bagula, Nadia District, West Bengal, within the Matua community.

Charal cites her parents as an early influence in her interest in feminism, describing an incident in which her father intervened to prevent a case of domestic abuse in their village, as well as her mother's commitment to ensuring all her children were given an equal opportunity to gain an education. Her father worked as a security guard, but also took employment as a farmhand and woodcutter. She adopted the name 'Charal', signifying her membership in the marginalised Matua community, after facing discrimination on the grounds of caste for it. She completed a bachelor's degree in Commerce and began working as a clerk in the Indian Railways after qualifying through an exam, later resigning after experiencing discrimination and harassment based on caste.

== Career ==
Kalyani Thakur Charal has published four volumes of poetry: Dhorlei Juddho Sunischit, Je Meye Adhar Gone, Chandalinir Kabita, and Chandalini Bhone. In addition to these, she has published a volume of critical essays titled Chandalinir Bibriti, and a collection of short stories, and an autobiography, Ami Keno Charal Likhi (Why I Write Charal). Her autobiography, as well as her essay and poetry collections titled 'Chandalini' (tr: 'the untouchable woman') are widely popular, containing accounts of the discrimination that she faced for reasons of caste, while working in government service. In 2017 she won the Sparrow Literary Award for her autobiography. She edited the volume Dalit Lekhika: Women’s Writing from Bengal. Her work has been received to critical acclaim, with one essay on Dalit women's writing from Bengal applauding her "strong and powerful voice". Her adoption of the pen-name 'Charal' has also been praised for 'recovering space' for Dalit writers.

In 2003 Charal began publishing a multilingual magazine called Nir, which contained recordings of folklore, poetry, plays, and fiction, as well as non-fiction writing focusing on Dalit experiences. The magazine included contributions in Bengali as well as local languages and dialects including Santali, Kamtapuri, Rarh, and Dapno. The magazine continues to be in wide local circulation, and has provided a platform for people belonging to marginalised communities to record personal experiences. Charal is a member of the editorial board of Chaturtha Duniya, a Bengali publishing house that focuses on works by Dalit writers, and is also on the board of the Dalit Sahitya Sabha, a literary organisation dedicated to Dalit literature. In an interview, Charal cited Bengali poets and writers including Subhas Mukhopadhyay, Purnendu Patri, Binoy Majumder, and Rabindranath Tagore, as her early influences.
