= Common Entrance Test =

Competitive exam in India

The Common Entrance Test (CET) is a competitive exam conducted for the purpose of admission of students to the first year or first semester of full-time courses in medical, dental and engineering courses in professional colleges in the state of Karnataka.

The professional colleges in the state offering such courses are affiliated with the state run universities and admit students through the CET annually. The fee structure varies from year to year.

The Karnataka government has launched a free online crash course "GetCETGo" to help students prepare for CET 2020 during COVID-19 lockdown.
