= Who Were the Shudras? =

1946 book by B. R. Ambedkar

- Author: B. R. Ambedkar
- Genre: History
- Publication date: 1946
- ISBN: 978-9-355-71180-9

Who Were the Shudras? is a history book published by Indian social reformer and polymath B. R. Ambedkar in 1946. The book discusses the origin of the Shudra Varna. Ambedkar dedicated the book to Jyotirao Phule (1827–1890).

== Subject of the book ==
In the book, Ambedkar citing Rigveda, Mahabharata, and other ancient vedic scriptures, estimates that the Shudras were originally Aryans.

Ambedkar writes in the preface of the book,

"Two questions are raised in this book: (1) Who were the Shudras? and (2) How they came to be the fourth Varna of the Indo-Aryan society? My answers to them are summarised below.

1. The Shudras were one of the Aryan communities of the solar race
2. There was a time when the Aryan society recognised only three Varnas, namely. Brahmins, Kshatriyas and Vaishyas.
3. The Shudras did not form a separate Varna. They ranked as part of the Kshatriya Varna in the Indo-Aryan society.
4. There was a continuous feud between the Shudra kings and the Brahmins in which the Brahmins were subjected to many tyrannies and indignities.
5. As a result of the negligence towards the Shudras generated by their tyrannies and oppressions, the Brahmins refused to perform the Upanayana of the Shudras.
6. Owing to the denial of Upanayana, the Shudras who were Kshatriyas became socially degraded, fell below the rank of the Vaishyas and thus came to form the fourth Varna."

Importantly, Ambedkar states that the Shudras of Hindu society are entirely different from Shudras of ancient Indo-Aryan Society. The common misconception that the two are related in terms of ancestry stems from the fact that people believe that the Hindu and Indo-Aryan meaning of the word "Shudras" is the same, when they are actually different. In the Indo-Aryan society, the word referred to a particular race of people, whereas in the Hindu society, the word loosely applies to individuals of a low social status, who are considered "uncultured". Ambedkar claims that the application of the word in the Hindu sense is incorrect as it wrongly associates them with the people and culture of the Indo-Aryan society, who committed wrongdoings, such as offending the Brahmins.

Ambedkar also discusses Aryan race theory and rejects the Indo-Aryan migrations in the book.

According to Arvind Sharma, Ambedkar noticed certain flaws in the Indo-Aryan migrations that were later acknowledged by western scholarship. For example, scholars now acknowledge anās in Rig Veda 5.29.10 refers to speech rather than the shape of the nose. Ambedkar anticipated this modern view by stating that there are two main understandings of the word Anasa. The first, by Max Müller, is read as a-nasa, and refers to having a flat nose, or no nose at all. Whereas, the second, by Sayanacharya, is read as an-asa, and refers to the lack of mouth, or the lack of good speech. Although Ambedkar acknowledges that Müller's version supports the belief that Dasyus and Aryans were of different races, he claims that there is a lack of evidence for this view, and expresses support for Sayanacharya's view.

== Contents ==
Preface

=== Part I ===
1. Chapter I - The Riddle of the Shudras
2. Chapter II - The Brahmanic Theory of the Origin of the Shudras
3. Chapter III - The Brahmanic Theory of the Status of the Shudras
4. Chapter IV - Shudras Versus Aryans
5. Chapter V - Aryans Against Aryans
6. Chapter VI - Shudra And Dasas

=== Part II ===
1. Chapter VII - The Shudras were Kshatriyas
2. Chapter VIII - The Number of Varnas, Three or Four?
3. Chapter IX - Brahmins Versus Shudras
4. Chapter X - The Degradation of the Shudras
5. Chapter XI - The Story of Reconciliation
6. Chapter XII - The Theory in the Crucible.

== Criticism ==
Historian R. S. Sharma, criticized Ambedkar's book for relying solely on translations of texts for his information, and stated Ambedkar wrote the book with the sole purpose to prove Shudras were of high caste origin.

== See also ==
- Caste system in India
- Scheduled Castes and Scheduled Tribes
- Dalit
