= B. R. Ambedkar =

Indian jurist, economist, politician and social reformer (1891–1956)

- Ambedkar in the 1950s

1st Minister of Law and Justice
- In office 15 August 1947 – 6 October 1951
- Prime Minister: Jawaharlal Nehru
- Preceded by: Position established
- Succeeded by: Charu Chandra Biswas

Member of Parliament, Rajya Sabha from Bombay State
- In office 3 April 1952 – 6 December 1956

Chairman of the Constitution Drafting Committee
- In office 29 August 1947 – 24 January 1950

Member of the Constituent Assembly of India
- In office 9 December 1946 – 24 January 1950
- Constituency: • Bengal Province (1946–47) • Bombay Province (1947–50)

Minister of Labour in Viceroy's Executive Council
- In office 22 July 1942 – 20 October 1946
- Governors General: The Marquess of Linlithgow; The Viscount Wavell
- Preceded by: Feroz Khan Noon
Legislative positions
Leader of the Opposition in the Bombay Legislative Assembly
In office 1937–1942
Member of the Bombay Legislative Assembly
In office 1937–1942
Constituency	Bombay City (Byculla and Parel) General Urban
Member of the Bombay Legislative Council
In office 1926–1937

Personal details
- Born: Bhimrao Ramji Sakpal; 14 April 1891 Mhow, Central India Agency, British India
- Died: 6 December 1956 (aged 65) New Delhi, India
- Resting place: Chaitya Bhoomi; 19°01′30″N 72°50′02″E
- Party: Independent Labour Party; Scheduled Castes Federation
- Other political affiliations: Republican Party of India
- Spouses: Ramabai Ambedkar (m. 1906; died 1935); Savita Ambedkar (m. 1948)
- Children: Yashwant
- Relatives: Ambedkar family
- Education: University of Mumbai (BA, MA); Columbia University (MA, PhD); London School of Economics (MSc, DSc)
- Profession: Jurist; economist; politician; social reformer; writer
- Awards: Bharat Ratna (1990, posthumous)
- Nickname: Babasaheb

Bhimrao Ramji Ambedkar (Note: Marathi: भीमराव रामजी आम्बेडकर, romanized: Bhīmarāva Rāmajī Āmbēḍakara, IPA: [bʱimɾaʋ ɾamd͡ʒiː ambeɽkəɾ]) (14 April 1891 – 6 December 1956) was an Indian jurist, economist, social reformer and politician who chaired the committee that drafted the Constitution of India based on the debates of the Constituent Assembly of India and the first draft of Sir Benegal Narsing Rau. Ambedkar served as Law and Justice minister in the first cabinet of Jawaharlal Nehru. He later renounced Hinduism and converted to Buddhism, inspiring the Dalit Buddhist movement.

After graduating from Elphinstone College, University of Bombay, Ambedkar studied economics at Columbia University and the London School of Economics, receiving doctorates in 1927 and 1923, respectively, and was among a handful of Indian students to have done so at either institution in the 1920s. During his time at Columbia University, Ambedkar came under the influence of John Dewey and his philosophy of pragmatism. He also trained in the law at Gray's Inn, London. In his early career, he was an economist, professor, and lawyer. His later life was marked by his political activities; he became involved in campaigning and negotiations for partition, publishing journals, advocating political rights and social freedom for Dalits, and contributing to the establishment of the state of India. In 1956, he converted to Buddhism, initiating mass conversions of Dalits. He was also appointed to work with the Simon Commission.

In 1990, the Bharat Ratna, India's highest civilian award, was posthumously conferred on Ambedkar. The salutation Jai Bhim (lit. "Hail Bhim") is used by his followers to honour him. He is also referred to by the honorific Babasaheb, meaning "Respected Father".

== Early life and education ==
Ambedkar was born on 14 April 1891 in the town and military cantonment of Mhow (now officially known as Dr Ambedkar Nagar, Madhya Pradesh). He was the 14th and last child of Ramji Maloji Sakpal, an army officer who held the rank of Subedar, and Bhimabai Sakpal, daughter of Laxman Murbadkar. His family was of Marathi background from the town of Ambadawe (Mandangad taluka) in Ratnagiri district of modern-day Maharashtra. Ambedkar's ancestors had long worked for the army of the British East India Company, and his father served in the British Indian Army at the Mhow cantonment.

Ambedkar was born into a Mahar (Dalit) caste, who were treated as untouchables and subjected to socio-economic discrimination. Although they attended school, Ambedkar and other untouchable children were segregated and given little attention or help by teachers. They were not allowed to sit inside the class. When they needed to drink water, someone from a higher caste had to pour that water from a height as they were not allowed to touch either the water or the vessel that contained it. This task was usually performed for the young Ambedkar by the school peon, and if the peon was not available then he had to go without water; he described the situation later in his writings as "No peon, No Water". He was required to sit on a gunny sack which he had to take home with him.

Ramji Sakpal retired in 1894 and the family moved to Satara two years later. Shortly after their move, Ambedkar's mother died. The children were cared for by their paternal aunt and lived in difficult circumstances. Three sons – Balaram, Anandrao and Bhimrao – and two daughters – Manjula and Tulasa – of the Ambedkars survived them. Of his brothers and sisters, only Ambedkar passed his examinations and went to high school. His original surname was Sakpal but his father registered his name as Ambadawekar in school, meaning he comes from his native village 'Ambadawe' in Ratnagiri district. His Marathi Brahmin teacher, Krishnaji Keshav Ambedkar, changed his surname from 'Ambadawekar' to his own surname 'Ambedkar' in school records.

=== Education ===
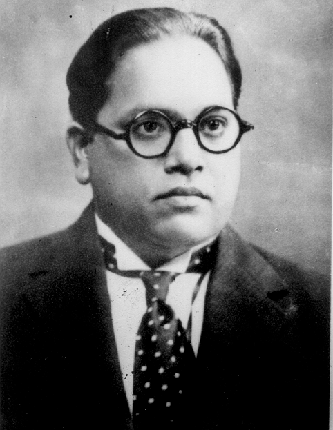
Ambedkar as a student

In 1897, Ambedkar's family moved to Mumbai where Ambedkar became the only untouchable enrolled at Elphinstone High School. In 1906, when he was about 15 years old, he married a nine-year-old girl, Ramabai. The match was arranged by the couple's parents, in accordance with prevailing custom at that time. In 1912, Ramabai gave birth to their first child, Yashwant Ambedkar, at the age of 14.

In 1907, he passed his matriculation examination and in the following year he entered Elphinstone College, which was affiliated to the University of Bombay, becoming, according to him, the first from his Mahar caste to do so. When he passed his English fourth standard examinations, the people of his community wanted to celebrate because they considered that he had reached "great heights" which he says was "hardly an occasion compared to the state of education in other communities". A public ceremony was evoked, to celebrate his success, by the community, and it was at this occasion that he was presented with a biography of the Buddha by Dada Keluskar, the author and a family friend.

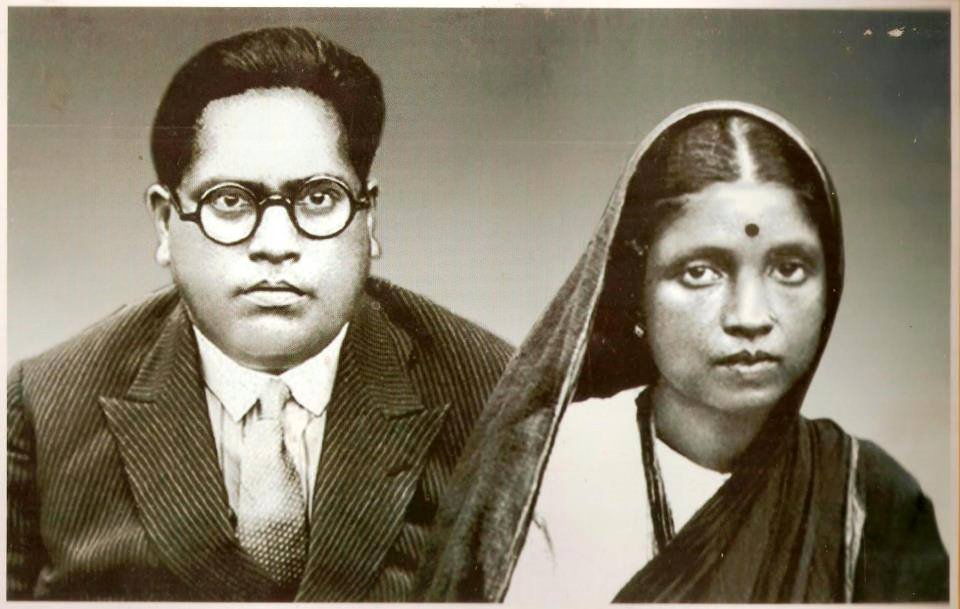
In 1907, Dr. B.R. Ambedkar married his first wife, 9 year old Ramabai, who gave birth to Yashwant Ambedkar in 1912.

By 1912, he obtained his degree in economics and political science from Bombay University, and prepared to take up employment with the Baroda state government. His wife had just moved his young family and started work when he had to quickly return to Mumbai to see his ailing father, who died on 2 February 1913.

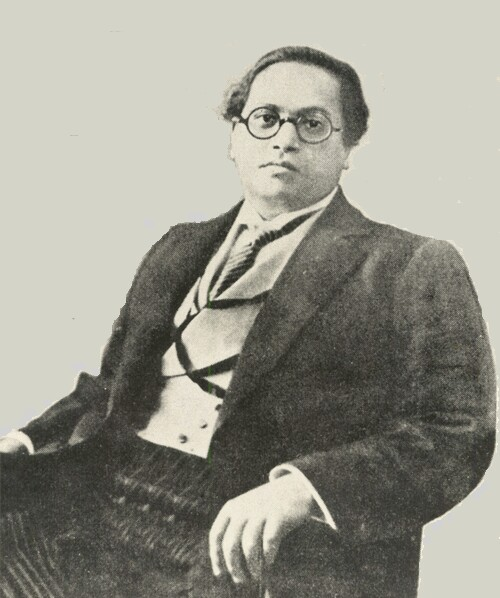
Ambedkar at Columbia University, c. 1916

In 1913, at the age of 22, Ambedkar was awarded a Baroda State Scholarship of £11.50 (Sterling) per month for three years under a scheme established by Sayajirao Gaekwad III (Gaekwad of Baroda) that was designed to provide opportunities for postgraduate education at Columbia University in New York City. Soon after arriving there he settled in rooms at Livingston Hall with Naval Bhathena, a Parsi who was to be a lifelong friend. He passed his M.A. exam in June 1915, majoring in economics, and other subjects of Sociology, History, Philosophy and Anthropology. He presented a thesis, Ancient Indian Commerce. Ambedkar was influenced by John Dewey and his work on democracy. In 1916, he completed his second master's thesis, National Dividend of India – A Historic and Analytical Study, for a second M.A. On 9 May, he presented the paper Castes in India: Their Mechanism, Genesis and Development before a seminar conducted by the anthropologist Alexander Goldenweiser. Ambedkar received his Ph.D. degree in economics at Columbia in 1927.

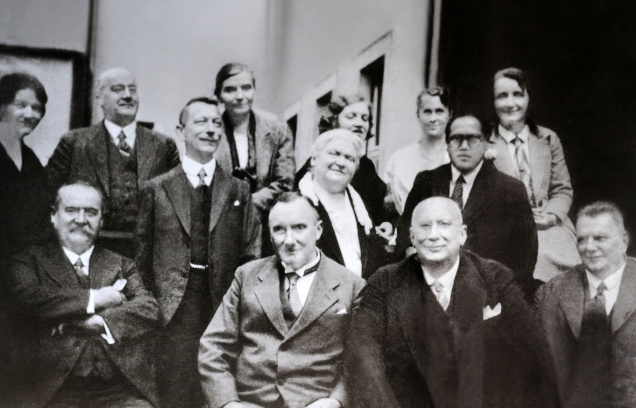
Ambedkar (In center line, first from right) with his professors and friends from the London School of Economics (1916–17)

In October 1916, he enrolled for the Bar course at Gray's Inn, and at the same time, helped by an introduction from his Columbia teacher Edwin R. A. Seligman, enrolled at the London School of Economics where he started working on a doctoral thesis. In June 1917, he returned to India because his scholarship from Baroda ended. His book collection was dispatched on a different ship from the one he was on, and that ship was torpedoed and sunk by a German submarine. He got permission to return to London to submit his thesis within four years. He returned in 1920 with support from Shahu of Kolhapur, and completed his master of science degree at the LSE in June 1921 with a thesis on "Provincial decentralization of imperial finance in India". His LSE doctoral thesis on "The problem of the rupee: Its origin and its solution", written under the guidance of Edwin Cannan, was accepted in early 1923. The D.Sc. in Economics was awarded to him by the University of London, and the same year he was called to the Bar by Gray's Inn.

== Opposition to untouchability ==
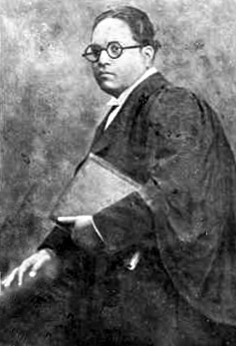
Ambedkar as a barrister in 1922

As Ambedkar was educated by the Princely State of Baroda, he was bound to serve it. He was appointed Military Secretary to the Gaikwad but had to quit in a short time. He described the incident in his autobiography, Waiting for a Visa. Thereafter, he tried to find ways to make a living for his growing family. He worked as a private tutor, as an accountant, and established an investment consulting business, but it failed when his clients learned that he was an untouchable. In 1918, he became professor of political economy in the Sydenham College of Commerce and Economics in Mumbai. Although he was successful with the students, other professors objected to his sharing a drinking-water jug with them.

Ambedkar had been invited to testify before the Southborough Committee, which was preparing the Government of India Act 1919. At this hearing, Ambedkar argued for creating separate electorates and reservations for untouchables and other religious communities. In 1920, he began the publication of the weekly Mooknayak (Leader of the Silent) in Mumbai with the help of Shahu of Kolhapur, that is, Shahu IV (1874–1922).

Ambedkar went on to work as a legal professional. In 1926, he successfully defended three non-Brahmin leaders who had accused the Brahmin community of ruining India and were then subsequently sued for libel. Dhananjay Keer notes, "The victory was resounding, both socially and individually, for the clients and the doctor".

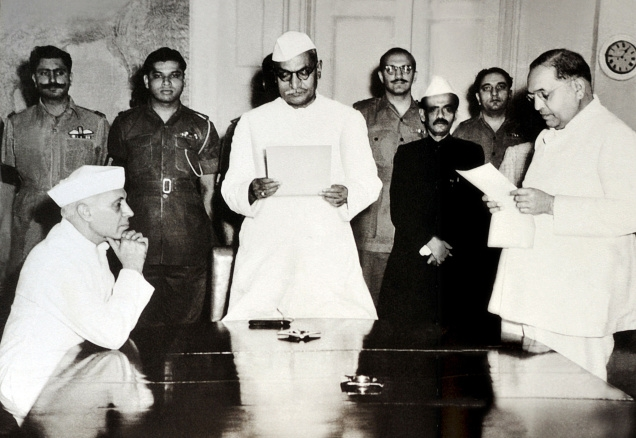
Sworn in as India's first Law and Justice Minister

While practising law in the Bombay High Court, he tried to promote education to untouchables and uplift them. His first organised attempt was his establishment of the central institution Bahishkrit Hitakarini Sabha, intended to promote education and socio-economic improvement, as well as the welfare of "outcastes", at the time referred to as depressed classes. For the defence of Dalit rights, he started many periodicals like Mook Nayak, Bahishkrit Bharat, and Equality Janta.

He was appointed to the Bombay Presidency Committee to work with the all-European Simon Commission in 1925. This commission had sparked great protests across India, and while its report was ignored by most Indians, Ambedkar himself wrote a separate set of recommendations for the future Constitution of India.

By 1927, Ambedkar had decided to launch active movements against untouchability. He began with public movements and marches to open up public drinking water resources. He also began a struggle for the right to enter Hindu temples. He led a satyagraha in Mahad to fight for the right of the untouchable community to draw water from the main water tank of the town. In a conference in late 1927, Ambedkar publicly condemned the classic Hindu text, the Manusmriti (Laws of Manu), for ideologically justifying caste discrimination and "untouchability", and he ceremonially burned copies of the ancient text. On 25 December 1927, he led thousands of followers to burn copies of Manusmriti. Thus annually 25 December is celebrated as Manusmriti Dahan Din (Manusmriti Burning Day) by Ambedkarites and Dalits.

In 1930, Ambedkar launched the Kalaram Temple movement after three months of preparation. About 15,000 volunteers assembled at Kalaram Temple satygraha making one of the greatest processions of Nashik. The procession was headed by a military band and a batch of scouts; women and men walked with discipline, order and determination to see the god for the first time. When they reached the gates, the gates were closed by Brahmin authorities.

== Poona Pact ==
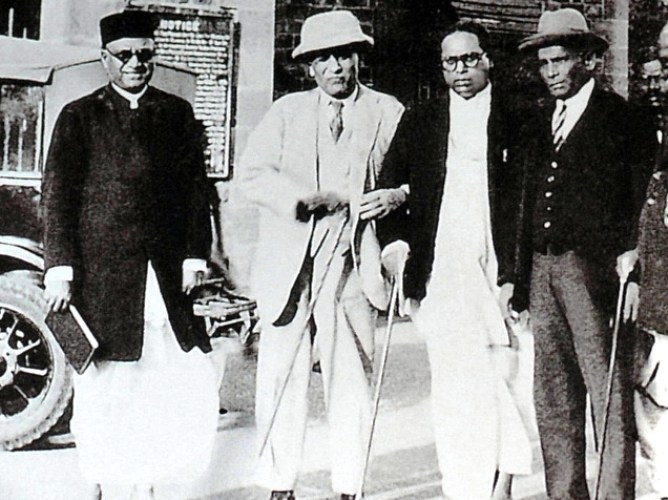
M.R. Jayakar, Tej Bahadur Sapru and Ambedkar at Yerwada jail, in Poona, on 24 September 1932, the day the Poona Pact was signed

In 1932, the British colonial government announced the formation of a separate electorate for "Depressed Classes" in the Communal Award. Mahatma Gandhi fiercely opposed a separate electorate for untouchables, saying he feared that such an arrangement would divide the Hindu community. Gandhi protested by fasting while imprisoned in the Yerwada Central Jail of Poona. Following the fast, congressional politicians and activists such as Madan Mohan Malaviya and Palwankar Baloo organised joint meetings with Ambedkar and his supporters at Yerwada. On 24 September 1932, the agreement, known as the Poona Pact and had 23 signatories, including Ambedkar (on behalf of the depressed classes among Hindus) and Madan Mohan Malaviya (on behalf of the other Hindus). The agreement gave reserved seats for the Depressed Classes in the Provisional legislatures within the general electorate. Due to the pact the depressed class received 148 seats in the legislature instead of the 71, as allocated in the Communal Award proposed earlier by the colonial government under Prime Minister Ramsay MacDonald. The text used the term "Depressed Classes" to denote Untouchables among Hindus who were later called Scheduled Castes and Scheduled Tribes under the India Act 1935 (Government of India Act, 1935), and the later Indian Constitution of 1950. In the Poona Pact, a unified electorate was in principle formed, but primary and secondary elections allowed Untouchables in practice to choose their own candidates.

== Political career ==
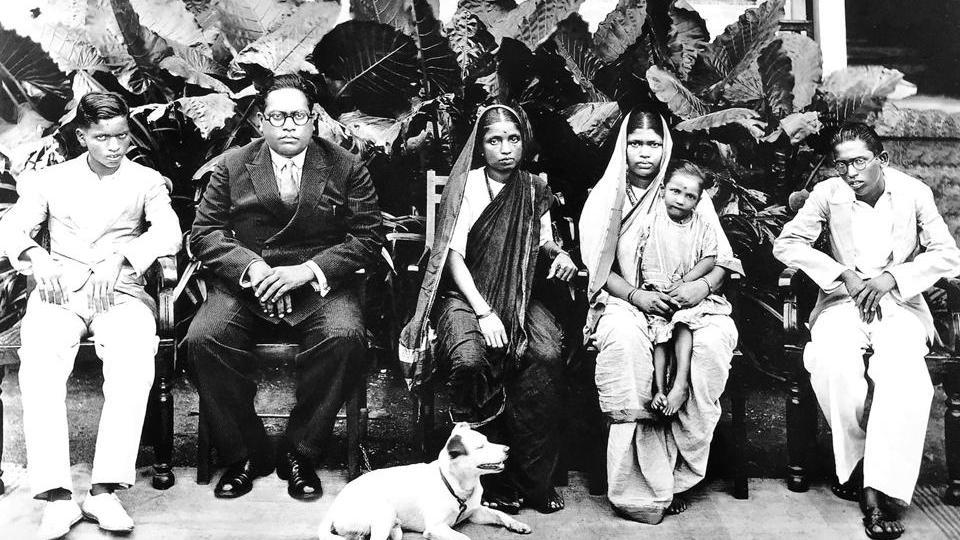
Ambedkar with his family members at Rajgraha in February 1934. From left – Yashwant (son), Ambedkar, Ramabai (wife), Laxmibai (wife of his elder brother, Balaram), Mukund (nephew) and Ambedkar's favourite dog, Tobby

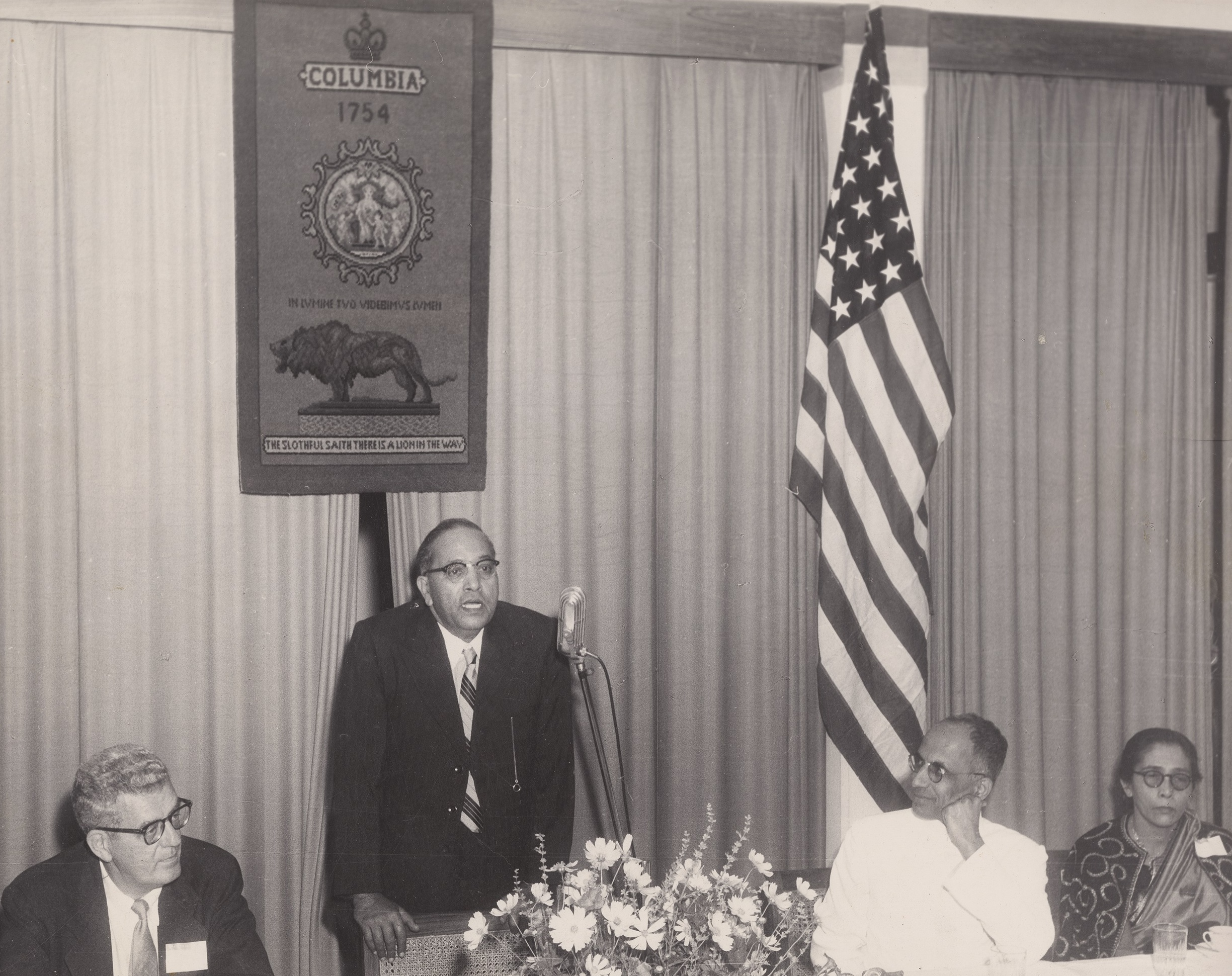
Ambedkar addresses a seminar in New Delhi on the occasion of the Columbia University Bicentennial, 1954

In 1935, Ambedkar was appointed principal of the Government Law College, Bombay, a position he held for two years. He also served as the chairman of Governing body of Ramjas College, University of Delhi, after the death of its Founder Shri Rai Kedarnath. Settling in Bombay (today called Mumbai), Ambedkar oversaw the construction of a house, and stocked his personal library with more than 50,000 books. His wife Ramabai died after a long illness the same year. It had been her long-standing wish to go on a pilgrimage to Pandharpur, but Ambedkar had refused to let her go, telling her that he would create a new Pandharpur for her instead of Hinduism's Pandharpur which treated them as untouchables. At the Yeola Conversion Conference on 13 October in Nasik, Ambedkar announced his intention to convert to a different religion and exhorted his followers to leave Hinduism. He would repeat his message at many public meetings across India.

In 1936, Ambedkar founded the Independent Labour Party, which contested the 1937 Bombay election to the Central Legislative Assembly for the 13 reserved and 4 general seats, and secured 11 and 3 seats respectively.

Ambedkar published his book Annihilation of Caste on 15 May 1936. It strongly criticised Hindu orthodox religious leaders and the caste system in general, and included "a rebuke of Gandhi" on the subject. Later, in a 1955 BBC interview, he accused Gandhi of writing in opposition of the caste system in English language papers while writing in support of it in Gujarati language papers. In his writings, Ambedkar also accused Jawaharlal Nehru of being "conscious of the fact that he is a Brahmin".

During this time, Ambedkar also fought against the khoti system prevalent in Konkan, where khots, or government revenue collectors, regularly exploited farmers and tenants. In 1937, Ambedkar tabled a bill in the Bombay Legislative Assembly aimed at abolishing the khoti system by creating a direct relationship between government and farmers.

Ambedkar served on the Defence Advisory Committee and the Viceroy's Executive Council as minister of labour. Before the Day of Deliverance events, Ambedkar stated that he was interested in participating: "I read Mr. Jinnah's statement and I felt ashamed to have allowed him to steal a march over me and rob me of the language and the sentiment which I, more than Mr. Jinnah, was entitled to use." He went on to suggest that the communities he worked with were twenty times more oppressed by Congress policies than were Indian Muslims; he clarified that he was criticizing Congress, and not all Hindus. Jinnah and Ambedkar jointly addressed the heavily attended Day of Deliverance event in Bhindi Bazaar, Bombay, where both expressed "fiery" criticisms of the Congress party, and according to one observer, suggested that Islam and Hinduism were irreconcilable.

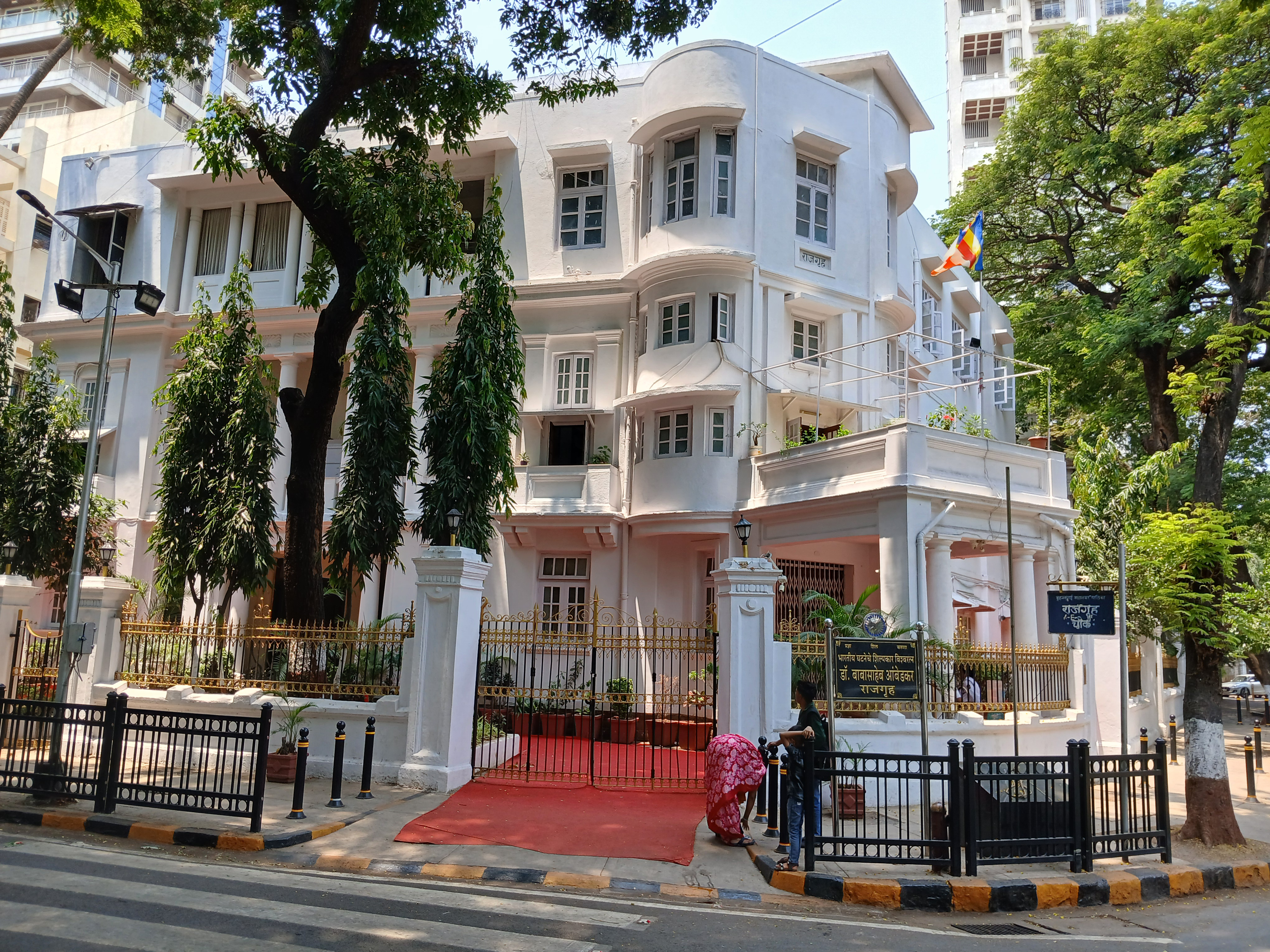
Following his success as a barrister, Ambedkar built a house in Dadar, a Hindu colony of Mumbai.

In his work Who Were the Shudras?, Ambedkar tried to explain the formation of untouchables. He saw Shudras and Ati Shudras who form the lowest caste in the ritual hierarchy of the caste system, as separate from Untouchables. Ambedkar oversaw the transformation of his political party into the Scheduled Castes Federation. It did not fare well in the 1946 provincial elections, but in Bengal, it managed to elect Ambedkar to the Constituent Assembly of India by winning support from Congress legislators.

Jagjivan Ram's wife Indrani Jagjivan Ram wrote in her memoir that Ambedkar persuaded her husband to ask Mahatma Gandhi for his inclusion in Nehru's cabinet in independent India. Initially, Jagjivan Ram consulted Vallabhbhai Patel before asking Gandhi to recommend Ambedkar to Nehru for inclusion in cabinet, adding that Ambedkar had "given up his antagonism to Congress and Gandhiji". Ambedkar was ultimately included as the law minister of India in the First Nehru ministry after Gandhi recommended his name to Nehru.

On 27 September 1951, Ambedkar resigned from Nehru's cabinet ministry after Hindu code bill was defeated in parliament.

Ambedkar contested in the Bombay North first Indian General Election of 1952, but lost to his former assistant and Congress Party candidate Narayan Sadoba Kajrolkar. Ambedkar became a member of Rajya Sabha, probably an appointed member. He tried to enter Lok Sabha again in the by-election of 1954 from Bhandara, but he placed third (the Congress Party won). By the time of the second general election in 1957, Ambedkar had died.

Ambedkar also criticised Islamic practice in South Asia. While justifying the Partition of India, he condemned child marriage and the mistreatment of women in Muslim society.

No words can adequately express the great and many evils of polygamy and concubinage, and especially as a source of misery to a Muslim woman. Take the caste system. Everybody infers that Islam must be free from slavery and caste. [...] [While slavery existed], much of its support was derived from Islam and Islamic countries. While the prescriptions by the Prophet regarding the just and humane treatment of slaves contained in the Koran are praiseworthy, there is nothing whatever in Islam that lends support to the abolition of this curse. But if slavery has gone, caste among Musalmans [Muslims] has remained.

== On partition ==
After the Lahore resolution (1940) of the Muslim League demanding a separate state, Ambedkar published Pakistan or The Partition of India (1940) in which sought to define the ILP's stance, and Thoughts on Pakistan (1941). In these, Ambedkar argued that attempts to forge Hindu-Muslim unity within a single state would lead to continuous conflict, administrative chaos, and potential civil war. He dismissed as simplistic the complaint that the British were to blame for the communal divide: a "policy of divide and rule, allowing that the British do resort to it, cannot succeed unless there are elements which make division possible, and further if the policy succeeds for such a long time, it means that the elements which divide are more or less permanent and irreconcilable and are not transitory or superficial".

"In the last analysis"—Ambedkar quotes the Irish republican, Sinn Féin Vice-President, Michael O'Flanagan— "the test of nationality is the wish of the people". If the Muslim majority in the north-west provinces and east Bengal insisted on political separation, then—as O'Flanagen conceded in the case of Protestant resistance in Ulster to an all-Ireland republic—there was no nationalist case for a single constitution. Failing to confront this reality, Gandhi and others within the Hindu leadership of Congress had been demonstrating more "concern and regard for safeguarding the rights and interests of the Muslims" than for "addressing even the basic necessities of the most marginalised section of Hindu society, the ‘untouchables’". In reducing the scope for communal disputes, Muslim secession would remove a constant distraction from the true democratic challenge of independence, the urgent need for social reforms.

Ambedkar accepted that, with compulsory population exchanges, the provincial boundaries of Punjab and Bengal should be redrawn to separate the Muslim and non-Muslim majority parts. Venkat Dhulipala states that such dissent from the all-India nationalist position "rocked Indian politics for a decade". It determined the course of dialogue between the Muslim League and the Indian National Congress, paving the way for a two-state solution. In his preface to a second, 1945, edition of Pakistan or The Partition of India, Ambedkar claimed that, as they edged toward agreement on partition, Gandhi and Muhammad Ali Jinnah had come to view his work as "an authority" on the subject.

== India's Constitution ==
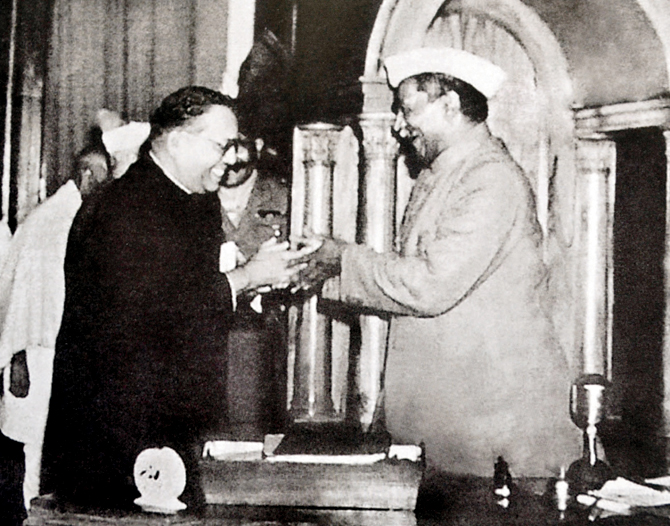
Ambedkar, chairman of the Drafting Committee, presenting the final draft of the Indian Constitution to Rajendra Prasad, president of the Constituent Assembly, on 25 November 1949

Upon India's independence on 15 August 1947, the new prime minister Jawaharlal Nehru invited Ambedkar to serve as the Dominion of India's Law Minister; two weeks later, he was appointed Chairman of the Drafting Committee of the Constitution for the future Republic of India.

On 25 November 1949, Ambedkar in his concluding speech in constituent assembly said:

"The credit that is given to me does not really belong to me. It belongs partly to Sir B.N. Rau the Constitutional Advisor to the Constituent Assembly who prepared a rough draft of the Constitution for the consideration of the Drafting Committee."

Indian constitution guarantees and protections for a wide range of civil liberties for individual citizens, including freedom of religion, the abolition of untouchability, and the outlawing of all forms of discrimination. Ambedkar was one of the ministers who argued for extensive economic and social rights for women, and won the Assembly's support for introducing a system of reservations of jobs in the civil services, schools and colleges for members of scheduled castes and scheduled tribes and Other Backward Class, a system akin to affirmative action. India's lawmakers hoped to eradicate the socio-economic inequalities and lack of opportunities for India's depressed classes through these measures. The Constitution was adopted on 26 November 1949 by the Constituent Assembly.

Steven Calabresi has voiced agreement with Martha C. Nussbaum's assessment of the Indian constitution as "Ambedkar's constitution," on account of the Supreme Court of India having evolved away from judicial restraint and legal positivism favored and successfully executed into the Constitution in 1950 by Jawaharlal Nehru and leaders of India's anti-colonial nationalist movement who held sway in the Constituent Assembly of India to an purposive approach by which the court rules today, whereby it is the final arbiter of the Constitution's meaning and its interpretations are binding on the executive and legislative branches of the government. Ambedkar had supported the purposive approach during the drafting of the constitution from 1947 to 1949 but his views were in a minority.

Ambedkar had openly shared his concern in the Constituent Assembly that country might lose both its Constitution and its democratic freedoms in the future. He believed that the lack of a strong democratic tradition, the widespread presence of ‘bhakti’ or political ‘hero worship’ and the large gap between the republican promises of the Constitution and socio-economic inequality, made this a distinct and ever-present possibility. He was among the principal voices in the Constituent Assembly opposing the constitutional inclusion of the term "Socialist" to the preamble.

Mr. Vice-President Sir, I regret that I cannot accept the amendment of Prof. K. T. Shah. What should be the policy of the State, how the Society should be organised in its social and economic side are matters which must be decided by the people themselves according to time and circumstances. It cannot be laid down in the Constitution itself, because that is destroying democracy altogether. If you state in the Constitution that the social organisation of the State shall take a particular form, you are, in my judgment, taking away the liberty of the people to decide what should be the social organisation in which they wish to live. It is perfectly possible today, for the majority people to hold that the socialist organisation of society is better than the capitalist organisation of society. But it would be perfectly possible for thinking people to devise some other form of social organisation which might be better than the socialist organisation of today or of tomorrow. I do not see therefore why the Constitution should tie down the people to live in a particular form and not leave it to the people themselves to decide it for themselves. This is one reason why the amendment should be opposed.

— B.R Ambedkar, Draft Constitution, Constituent Assembly Debates Volume 7, 15 Nov 1948

Ambedkar expressed his disapproval for the constitution in 1953 during a parliament session and said "People always keep on saying to me "Oh you are the maker of the constitution". My answer is I was a hack. What I was asked to do, I did much against my will." Ambedkar added that, "I am quite prepared to say that I shall be the first person to burn it out. I do not want it. It does not suit anybody."

== Economics ==
Ambedkar was the first Indian to pursue a doctorate in economics abroad. He argued that industrialisation and agricultural growth could enhance the Indian economy. He stressed investment in agriculture as the primary industry of India. Ambedkar advocated national economic and social development, stressing education, public hygiene, community health, residential facilities as the basic amenities. His DSc thesis, The problem of the Rupee: Its Origin and Solution (1923) examines the causes for the Rupee's fall in value. In this dissertation, he argued in favour of a gold standard in modified form, and was opposed to the gold-exchange standard favoured by Keynes in his treatise Indian Currency and Finance (1909), claiming it was less stable. He favoured the stoppage of all further coinage of the rupee and the minting of a gold coin, which he believed would fix currency rates and prices.

He also analysed revenue in his PhD dissertation The Evolution of Provincial Finance in British India. In this work, he analysed the various systems used by the British colonial government to manage finances in India. His views on finance were that governments should ensure their expenditures have "faithfulness, wisdom and economy." "Faithfulness" meaning governments should use money as nearly as possible to the original intentions of spending the money in the first place. "Wisdom" meaning it should be used as well as possible for the public good, and "economy" meaning the funds should be used so that the maximum value can be extracted from them.

Ambedkar opposed income tax for low-income groups. He contributed in Land Revenue Tax and excise duty policies to stabilise the economy. He played an important role in land reform and the state economic development. According to him, the caste system, due to its division of labourers and hierarchical nature, impedes movement of labour (higher castes would not do lower-caste occupations) and movement of capital (assuming investors would invest first in their own caste occupation). His theory of State Socialism had three points: state ownership of agricultural land, the maintenance of resources for production by the state, and a just distribution of these resources to the population. He emphasised a free economy with a stable Rupee which India has adopted recently. He advocated birth control to develop the Indian economy, and this has been adopted by Indian government as national policy for family planning. He emphasised equal rights for women for economic development.

A number of Ambedkar's ideas reflected deep interest in Austrian school of economics. The ideas of Ambedkar were close to those of Carl Menger, Ludwig von Mises, Friedrich Hayek, and William Graham Sumner. Ambedkar's theory of free banking was built on Menger's work and also on Gopal Krishna Gokhale's treatise on finance and money. Ambedkar's view about distinguishing differential quality of money was influenced by Menger's idea of sale-ability of money which is found in Menger's article 'On the Origin of Money'. Ambedkar's recommendations for free banking were ignored by both Royal Commission and Indian government.

In his book, The Evolution of Provincial Finance in British India, Ambedkar wrote "a Central Government for the whole of India could not be said to possess knowledge and experience of all various conditions prevailing in different Provinces under it. It, therefore, necessarily becomes an authority less competent to deal with matters of provincial administration than the Provisional Governments."

Ambedkar's views on agricultural land was that too much of it was idle, or that it was not being utilized properly. He believed there was an "ideal proportion" of production factors that would allow agricultural land to be used most productively. To this end, he saw the large portion of people who lived on agriculture at the time as a major problem. Therefore, he advocated industrialization of the economy to allow these agricultural labourers to be of more use elsewhere. Ambedkar was of the view that there is a need to shift surplus labour from agricultural channels to non-agricultural channels.

Ambedkar was trained as an economist, and was a professional economist until 1921, when he became a political leader. He wrote three books on economics:

- Administration and Finance of the East India Company
- The Evolution of Provincial Finance in British India
- The Problem of the Rupee: Its Origin and Its Solution

== Marriage ==
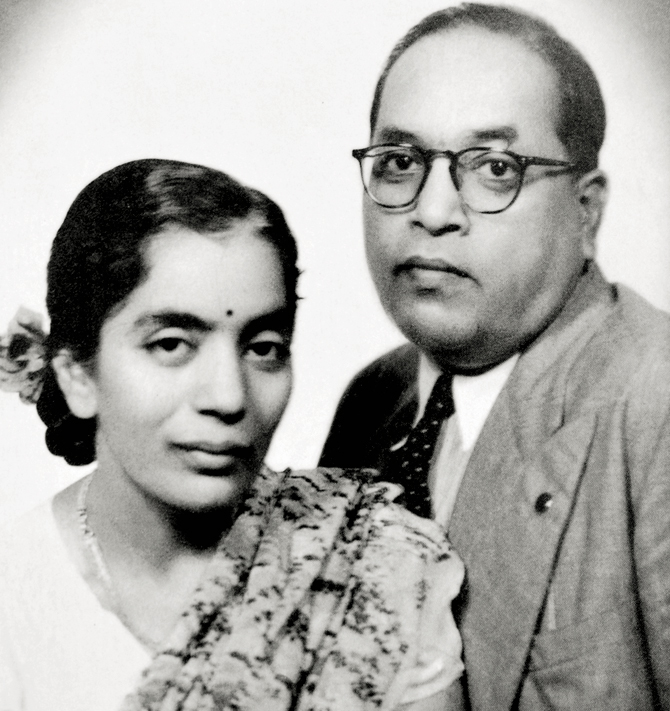
Ambedkar with wife Savita in 1948

Ambedkar's first wife Ramabai died in 1935 after prolonged illness. After completing the draft of India's constitution in the late 1940s, he suffered from lack of sleep, had neuropathic pain in his legs, and was taking insulin and homoeopathic medicines. He went to Bombay for treatment, and there met Sharada Kabir, MBBS, whom he married on 15 April 1948, at his home in New Delhi. Doctors recommended a companion who was a good cook and was a medical practitioner to care for him. She adopted the name Savita Ambedkar and cared for him the rest of his life. Savita Ambedkar, who was called also 'Mai', died on 29 May 2003, aged 93 in Mumbai.

== Conversion to Buddhism ==
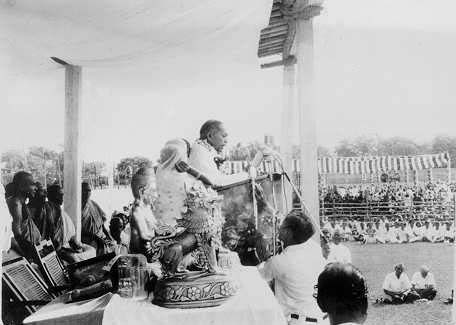
Ambedkar delivering a speech during a mass conversion ceremony

Ambedkar considered converting to Sikhism, which encouraged opposition to oppression and so appealed to leaders of scheduled castes. But after meeting with Sikh leaders, he concluded that he might get "second-rate" Sikh status.

Instead, around 1950, he began devoting his attention to Buddhism and travelled to Ceylon (now Sri Lanka) to attend a meeting of the World Fellowship of Buddhists. While dedicating a new Buddhist vihara near Pune, Ambedkar announced he was writing a book on Buddhism, and that when it was finished, he would formally convert to Buddhism. He twice visited Burma in 1954; the second time to attend the third conference of the World Fellowship of Buddhists in Rangoon. In 1955, he founded the Bharatiya Bauddha Mahasabha, or the Buddhist Society of India. In 1956, he completed his final work, The Buddha and His Dhamma, and requested Jawaharlal Nehru to help him promote the book through government funding. Nehru rejected Ambedkar's request. The book was later published posthumously.

After meetings with the Sri Lankan Buddhist monk Hammalawa Saddhatissa, Ambedkar organised a formal public ceremony for himself and his supporters in Nagpur on 14 October 1956. Accepting the Three Refuges and Five Precepts from a Buddhist monk in the traditional manner, Ambedkar completed his own conversion, along with his wife. He then proceeded to convert some 500,000 of his supporters who were gathered around him. He prescribed the 22 Vows for these converts, after the Three Jewels and Five Precepts. He then travelled to Kathmandu, Nepal to attend the Fourth World Buddhist Conference. His work on The Buddha or Karl Marx and "Revolution and counter-revolution in ancient India" remained incomplete.

== Death ==
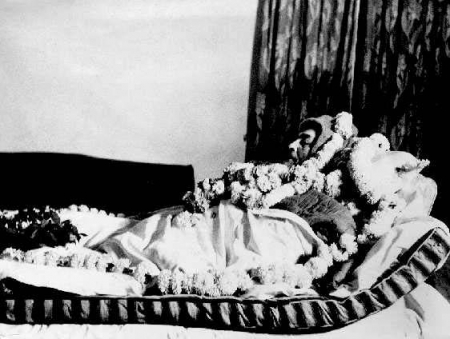
Death of B. R. Ambedkar

Since 1948, Ambedkar had diabetes. He remained in bed from June to October in 1954 due to medication side-effects and poor eyesight. His health worsened during 1955. Three days after completing his final manuscript The Buddha and His Dhamma, Ambedkar died in his sleep on 6 December 1956 at his home in Delhi.

A Buddhist cremation was organised at Dadar Chowpatty beach on 7 December, attended by half a million grieving people. No ministers attended his funeral. A conversion program was organised on 16 December 1956, so that cremation attendees were also converted to Buddhism at the same place.

Ambedkar was survived by his second wife Savita Ambedkar (known as Maisaheb Ambedkar), who died in 2003, and his son Yashwant Ambedkar (known as Bhaiyasaheb Ambedkar), who died in 1977. Savita and Yashwant carried on the socio-religious movement started by B. R. Ambedkar. Yashwant served as the 2nd President of the Buddhist Society of India (1957–1977) and a member of the Maharashtra Legislative Council (1960–1966). Ambedkar's elder grandson, Prakash Yashwant Ambedkar, is the chief-adviser of the Buddhist Society of India, leads the Vanchit Bahujan Aghadi and has served in both houses of the Indian Parliament. Ambedkar's younger grandson, Anandraj Ambedkar leads the Republican Sena (tran: The "Republican Army").

A number of unfinished typescripts and handwritten drafts were found among Ambedkar's notes and papers and gradually made available. Among these were Waiting for a Visa, which probably dates from 1935 to 1936 and is an autobiographical work, and the Untouchables, or the Children of India's Ghetto, which refers to the census of 1951.

A memorial for Ambedkar was established in his Delhi house at 26 Alipur Road. His birthdate known as Ambedkar Jayanti or Bhim Jayanti is observed as a public holiday in many Indian states. He was posthumously awarded India's highest civilian honour, the Bharat Ratna, in 1990.

On the anniversary of his birth and death, and on Dhamma Chakra Pravartan Din (14 October) at Nagpur, at least half a million people gather to pay homage to him at his memorial in Mumbai. Thousands of bookshops are set up, and books are sold. His message to his followers was "educate, agitate, organise!"

== Legacy ==
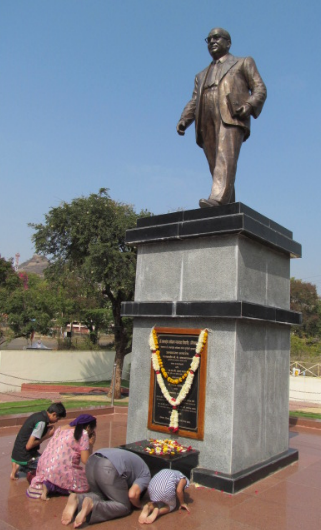
People paying tribute at the central statue of Ambedkar in Dr. Babasaheb Ambedkar Marathwada University in Aurangabad.

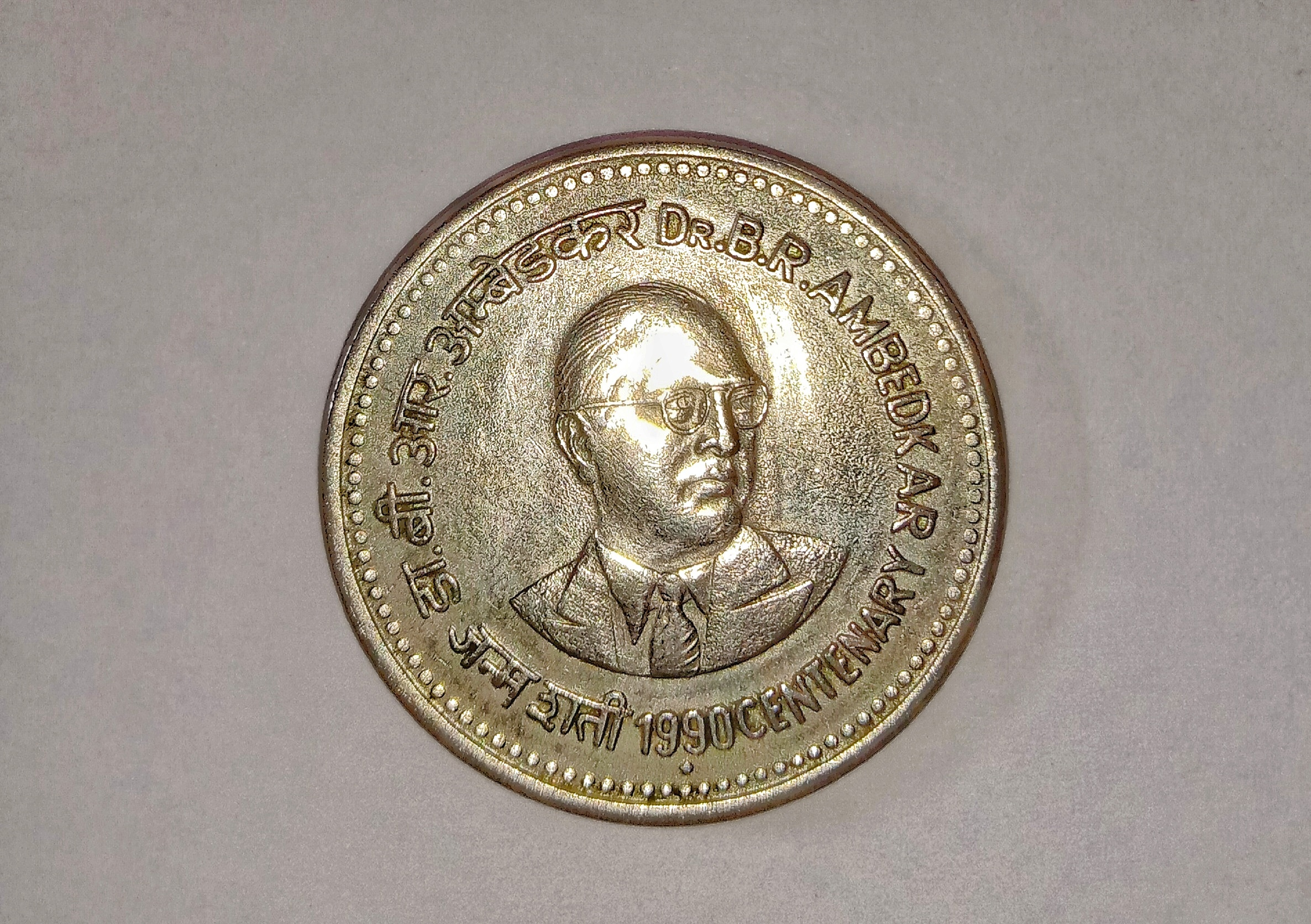
1990 1 Rupee commemorative coin of India dedicated to B.R. Ambedkar

Decades after death of Ambedkar, his relevance increased with Indian politics getting competitive and divisive. Scholar Anand Teltumbde noted, "Earlier when there was a monopoly of the Congress, he was neglected. Even 10 years after his death in 1956, there was not a single road or a monument in his name." Ambedkar's image as a socio-political reformer saw a deep effect on modern India. In post-Independence India, his socio-political thought is respected across the political spectrum. His initiatives have influenced various spheres of life and transformed the way India today looks at socio-economic policies, education and affirmative action through socio-economic and legal incentives. He passionately believed in individual freedom and criticised caste society. His accusations of Hinduism as being the foundation of the caste system made him controversial and unpopular among Hindus. His conversion to Buddhism sparked a revival in interest in Buddhist philosophy in India and abroad.

Many public institutions are named in his honour, and the Dr. Babasaheb Ambedkar International Airport in Nagpur, otherwise known as Sonegaon Airport. Dr. B. R. Ambedkar National Institute of Technology, Jalandhar, Ambedkar University Delhi is also named in his honour.

The Maharashtra government has acquired a house in London where Ambedkar lived during his days as a student in the 1920s. The house is expected to be converted into a museum-cum-memorial to Ambedkar.

Ambedkar was voted "the Greatest Indian" since independence by a poll organised by History TV18 and CNN IBN, ahead of Patel and Nehru, in 2012. Nearly 20 million votes were cast. Due to his role in economics, Narendra Jadhav, a notable Indian economist, has said that Ambedkar was "the highest educated Indian economist of all times." Amartya Sen, said that Ambedkar is "father of my economics", and "he was highly controversial figure in his home country, though it was not the reality. His contribution in the field of economics is marvelous and will be remembered forever."

On 2 April 1967, a 3.66 metre (12 foot) tall bronze statue of Ambedkar was installed in the Parliament of India. The statue, sculpted by B.V. Wagh, was unveiled by the then President of India, Sarvepalli Radhakrishnan. On 12 April 1990, a portrait of B.R. Ambedkar is put in the Central Hall of Parliament House. The portrait of Ambedkar, painted by Zeba Amrohawi, was unveiled by the then Prime Minister of India, V. P. Singh. Another portrait of Ambedkar is put in the Parliamentary Museum and archives of the Parliament House.

Ambedkar's legacy was not without criticism. Ambedkar has been criticised for his one-sided views on the issue of caste at the expense of cooperation with the larger nationalist movement. Ambedkar has been also criticised by some of his biographers over his neglect of organization-building.

Ambedkar's political philosophy has given rise to a large number of political parties, publications and workers' unions that remain active across India, especially in Maharashtra. His promotion of Buddhism has rejuvenated interest in Buddhist philosophy among sections of population in India. Mass conversion ceremonies have been organised by human rights activists in modern times, emulating Ambedkar's Nagpur ceremony of 1956. Some Indian Buddhists regard him as a Bodhisattva, although he never claimed it himself. Outside India, during the late 1990s, some Hungarian Romani people drew parallels between their own situation and that of the downtrodden people in India. Inspired by Ambedkar, they started to convert to Buddhism.

The Ambedkar Statue in Hyderabad is a statue of B. R. Ambedkar located in Hyderabad. The statue was designed by Ram V. Sutar. The foundation stone was laid in 2016, but the construction of the statue began in 2021. The statue was inaugurated on 14 April 2023, by K. Chandrashekhar Rao, the Chief Minister of Telangana, on the 132nd Ambedkar Jayanti. Ambedkar's grandson Prakash Ambedkar was the chief guest of the event. The statue is made up of over 360 tonnes of steel and 100 tonnes of bronze. On 19 January 2024, a 125 feet tall "Statue of Social Justice" of Ambedkar was installed in Vijayawada, Andhra Pradesh, which stands on an 81 feet high platform. The Ambedkar statues in Hyderabad and Vijayawada are the fifth and fourth tallest statues in India respectively. In May 2026, a 450 feet tall "Statue of Equality" of Babasaheb Ambedkar will be ready at Indu Mill in Mumbai, which will be the second tallest statue in India and the third tallest in the world.

== Views ==
=== Religion ===
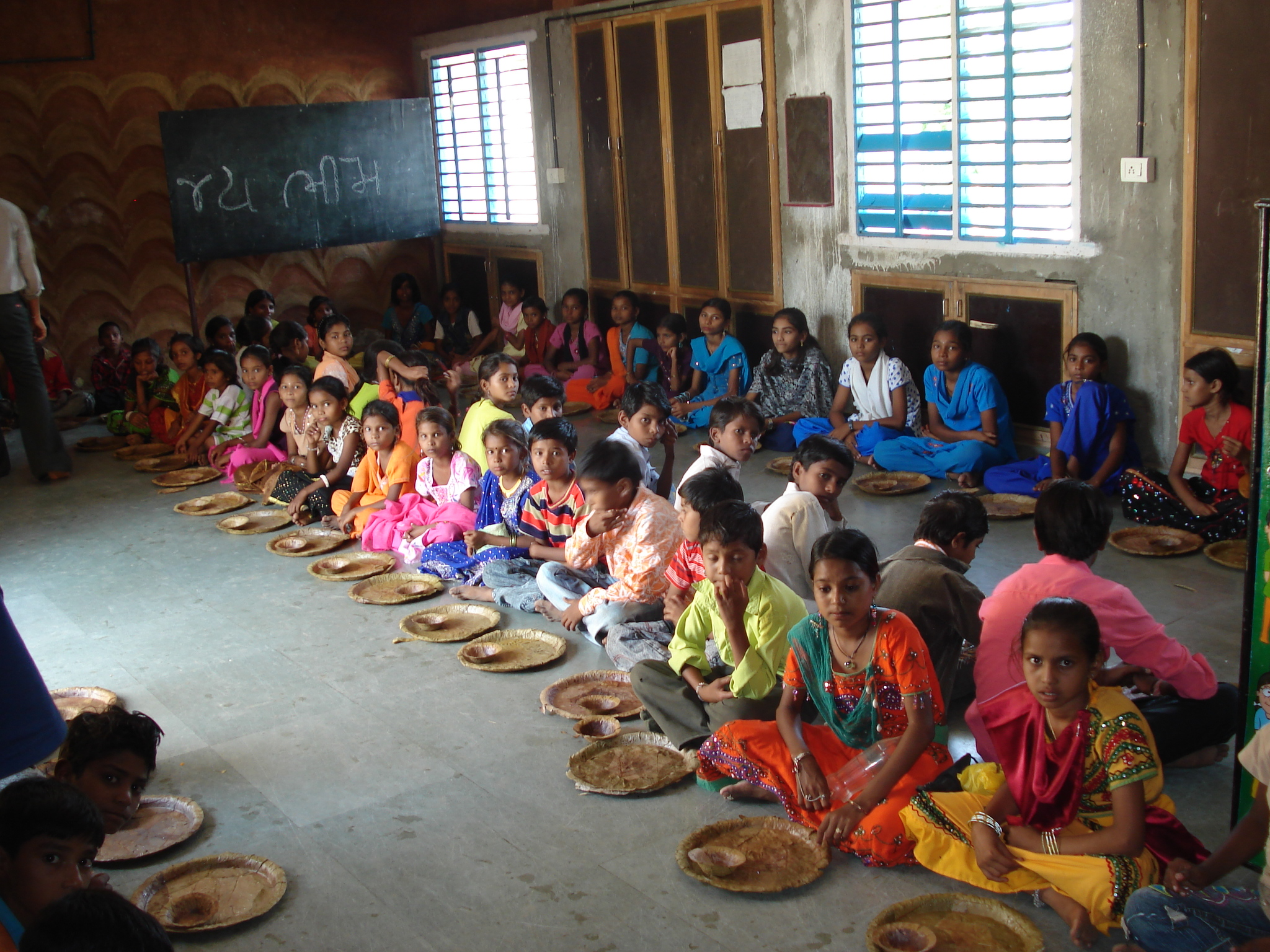
Children awaiting school lunch in Rayka (also Raika), a village in rural Gujarat. The salutation Jai Bhim written on the blackboard honours Ambedkar.

Ambedkar said in 1935 that he was born a Hindu but would not die a Hindu. He viewed Hinduism as an "oppressive religion" and started to consider conversion to any other religion. In Annihilation of Caste, Ambedkar claims that the only lasting way a true casteless society could be achieved is through destroying the belief of the sanctity of the Shastras and denying their authority. Ambedkar was critical of Hindu religious texts and epics and wrote a work titled Riddles in Hinduism during 1954–1955. The work was published posthumously by combining individual chapter manuscripts and resulted in mass demonstrations and counter demonstrations.

Ambedkar viewed Christianity to be incapable of fighting injustices. He wrote that "It is an incontrovertible fact that Christianity was not enough to end the slavery of the Negroes in the United States. A civil war was necessary to give the Negro the freedom which was denied to him by the Christians."

Ambedkar criticized distinctions within Islam and described the religion as "a close corporation and the distinction that it makes between Muslims and non-Muslims is a very real, very positive and very alienating distinction".

He opposed conversions of depressed classes to convert to Islam or Christianity added that if they converted to Islam then "the danger of Muslim domination also becomes real" and if they converted to Christianity then it "will help to strengthen the hold of Britain on the country".

Initially, Ambedkar planned to convert to Sikhism but he rejected this idea after he discovered that British government would not guarantee the privileges accorded to the untouchables in reserved parliamentary seats.

On 16 October 1956, he converted to Buddhism just weeks before his death.

=== On Jews ===
Ambedkar documented his views on Jews in his 1941 essay written for the Bombay Sentinel, "Moses and His Significance", in which he compared the condition of the Depressed Classes to Jews' bondage in Egypt and called the story of Moses a source of hope. The essay says that Jews "must be destined to have their land of promise". He admired the pioneering work of Jews in Palestine "in respect of the Social order that was being created there". He sympathised with Jewish national movement and said that he "trusted that Jews reached their promised land". A subsequent interview was carried out by Maurice David Japheth, editor of The Jewish Advocate, where the two found common ground in comparing the suffering of Dalits to that of the Jews in ancient Egypt.

=== Indo-Aryan migrations ===
Ambedkar viewed the Shudras as Aryan and disputed the Indo-Aryan migrations, describing "[t]he Aryan race theory" as "so absurd that it ought to have been dead long ago" in his 1946 book Who Were the Shudras?. Ambedkar viewed Shudras as originally having been "part of the Kshatriya Varna in the Indo-Aryan society", but became socially degraded after they inflicted many tyrannies on Brahmins.

Ambedkar disputed various hypotheses of the Aryan homeland being outside India, and concluded the Aryan homeland was India itself. According to Ambedkar, the Rig Veda says Aryans, Dāsa and Dasyus were competing religious groups, not different peoples.

=== Communism ===
Ambedkar was heavily influenced by John Dewey and his philosophy of pragmatism. Ambedkar's views on Communism were expressed in two 1956 texts, "Buddha or Karl Marx" and "Buddhism and Communism". According to Jaffrelot, Ambedkar "constantly criticised the Communists, whom he accused of exploiting the workers' cause to advance their own career". In a 1938 speech delivered to the Masur conference of depressed classes, Ambedkar said: "It is absolutely impossible for me to keep relations with the communists. I am an implacable enemy of the Communists."

Ambedkar stated that:

Carlyle called political economy a pig philosophy. Carlyle was of course wrong. For man needs material comforts. But the communist philosophy seems to equally wrong, for the aim of their philosophy seems to be fatten pigs, as though men are no better than pigs. Man must grow materially as well as spiritually. Buddha’s method was to change the mind of man without the use of force. Buddha sought to change man’s moral disposition to follow the path voluntarily.

He accepted that the privileged few's exploitation of the masses perpetuated poverty and its issues. However, he did not see this exploitation as purely economic, theorizing that the cultural aspects of exploitation are as bad or worse than economic exploitation. In addition, he did not see economic relationships as the only important aspect of human life. He identified that "communism stands for revolution and not for reformation" and also saw Communists as willing to resort to any means to achieve proletarian revolution, including violence, while he himself saw democratic and peaceful measures as the best option for change. Ambedkar also opposed the Marxist idea of controlling all the means of production and ending private ownership of property: seeing the latter measure as not able to fix the problems of society. In addition, Ambedkar rejected that state was a temporary institution and did not subscribe to the Marxian theory that it would eventually wither away, Ambedkar believed in a classless society, but also believed the state would exist as long as society and that it should be active in development. But in the 1950s, in an interview he gave to BBC, he accepted that the current liberal democratic system will collapse and the alternative, as he thinks, "is some kind of communism". Marxist theoretician Abhinav Sinha argues that Ambedkar was actually "warning the establishment about the possibility of communist revolution" rather than advocating for it.

Ambedkar's objections to communism were severely criticized by Marxist theoretician Abhinav Sinha, writing for the magazine The Anvil, he notes:

"Communism is not a sect of Bhikkhus and Ambedkar did not understand this simple fact, in his zealous attempt to prove that everything correct in Marxism has already been said by Buddha and whatever was not said by Buddha is incorrect in Marxism. However, it seems that Ambedkar made these bold claims without reading a single Marxist text. He also claims that a 60 year old political philosophy like communism would not work. And what would work? A 2500 years old philosophy of Buddhism! These are some of the “refutations” of Marxism by Ambedkar!" .... "Ambedkar did not have any understanding about Marxism as he had not read a single work by Marx, Engels or Lenin. Therefore the very question whether Ambedkar agreed or disagreed, in real sense of the terms, with Marxism or not is a non-question. The truth is that he did not have any understanding of Marxism."

== In popular culture ==
Several films, plays, and other works have been based on the life and thoughts of Ambedkar.

- Indian director Jabbar Patel made a documentary titled Dr. Babasaheb Ambedkar in 1991; he followed this with a full-length feature film Dr. Babasaheb Ambedkar in 2000 with Mammootty in the lead role. This biopic was sponsored by the National Film Development Corporation of India and the government's Ministry of Social Justice and Empowerment. The film was released after a long and controversial gestation.
- Other Indian films on Ambedkar include: Balaka Ambedkar (1991) by Basavaraj Kestur, Dr. Ambedkar (1992) by Bharath Parepalli, and Yugpurush Dr. Babasaheb Ambedkar (1993).
- David Blundell, professor of anthropology at UCLA and historical ethnographer, has established Arising Light – a series of films and events that are intended to stimulate interest and knowledge about the social conditions in India and the life of Ambedkar.
- In Samvidhaan, a TV mini-series on the making of the Constitution of India directed by Shyam Benegal, the pivotal role of B. R. Ambedkar was played by Sachin Khedekar.
- The play Ambedkar Aur Gandhi, directed by Arvind Gaur and written by Rajesh Kumar, tracks the two prominent personalities of its title.
- Bhimayana: Experiences of Untouchability is a graphic biography of Ambedkar created by Pardhan-Gond artists Durgabai Vyam and Subhash Vyam, and writers Srividya Natarajan and S. Anand. The book depicts the experiences of untouchability faced by Ambedkar from childhood to adulthood. CNN named it one of the top 5 political comic books.
- The Ambedkar Memorial at Lucknow is dedicated in his memory. The chaitya consists of monuments showing his biography.
- Jai Bhim slogan was given by the Dalit community in Delhi in his honour in 1946.
- Google commemorated Ambedkar's 124th birthday through a homepage doodle on 14 April 2015. The doodle was featured in India, Argentina, Chile, Ireland, Peru, Poland, Sweden and the United Kingdom.
- An Indian television show named Ek Mahanayak: Dr. B. R. Ambedkar portraying his life aired on &TV in 2019.
- Another show, Dr. Babasaheb Ambedkar - Mahamanvachi Gauravgatha, has aired in Marathi on Star Pravah from 2019.

== Works ==
The Education Department, Government of Maharashtra (Mumbai) published the collection of Ambedkar's writings and speeches in different volumes. The list of Ambedkar's works include the following:

- Castes in India: Their Mechanism, Genesis and Development and 11 Other Essays
- The Annihilation of Caste, (1936)
- Ambedkar in the Bombay Legislature, with the Simon Commission and at the Round Table Conferences, (1927–1939)
- Philosophy of Hinduism; India and the Pre-requisites of Communism; Revolution and Counter-revolution; Buddha or Karl Marx
- Riddles in Hinduism
- Essays on Untouchables and Untouchability
- The Evolution of Provincial Finance in British India
- The Untouchables Who Were They And Why They Became Untouchables ?
- Who Were the Shudras? (1946)
- Pakistan or The Partition of India (1945), originally published as Thoughts on Pakistan (1941)
- What Congress and Gandhi have done to the Untouchables; Mr. Gandhi and the Emancipation of the Untouchables
- Ambedkar as member of the Governor General's Executive Council, 1942–46
- The Buddha and his Dhamma
- Unpublished Writings; Ancient Indian Commerce; Notes on laws; Waiting for a Visa; Miscellaneous notes, etc.
- Ambedkar as the principal architect of the Constitution of India
- (2 parts) Dr. Ambedkar and The Hindu Code Bill
- Ambedkar as Free India's First Law Minister and Member of Opposition in Indian Parliament (1947–1956)
- The Pali Dictionary and The Pali Grammar
- Ambedkar and his Egalitarian Revolution – Struggle for Human Rights. Events starting from March 1927 to 17 November 1956 in the chronological order;
- Ambedkar and his Egalitarian Revolution – Socio-political and religious activities. Events starting from November 1929 to 8 May 1956 in the chronological order;
- Ambedkar and his Egalitarian Revolution – Speeches. (Events starting from 1 January to 20 November 1956 in the chronological order.)

== See also ==
- Ambedkar family
- Chaitya Bhoomi
- Deekshabhoomi
- Statue of Equality

== Notes ==
Rajya Sabha
Preceded by N/A	Member of Parliament for Rajya Sabha Bombay State (now Maharashtra); 1952–1956	Succeeded by N/A
Political offices
Preceded by Position established	Minister of Law and Justice; 1947–1951	Succeeded by Charu Chandra Biswas
Preceded by N/A	Chairman of the Constitution Drafting Committee; 1947–1950	Succeeded by N/A
