= Riddles in Hinduism =

Book by B. R. Ambedkar

Riddles in Hinduism: An Exposition to Enlighten the Masses
- Author: Bhimrao Ramji Ambedkar
- Language: English
- Series: Dr Babasaheb Ambedkar: Writings and Speeches (BAWS)
- Subject: Criticism of Hinduism
- Genre: non-fiction
- Publisher: Education Department, Government of Maharashtra
- Publication date: 1987
- Publication place: India
- ISBN: 978-93-5109-064-9 Series ISBN
- OCLC: 1003286723

Riddles in Hinduism is an English language book by the Indian social reformer and political leader B. R. Ambedkar, aimed at enlightening the Hindus, and challenging the static view of Hindu civilization circulated by "European scholars and Brahmanic theology". Ambedkar quotes various Hindu texts to criticize the "Brahmanic theology" of Hinduism. He discusses a variety of topics, including the contents, the authority, and the origin of the Hindu texts such as the Vedas; the absurdities, the contradictions, and the changing nature of the Hindu beliefs; and the discriminatory varna and the caste system, among other topics. The title of the book refers to questions ("riddles") that Ambedkar asks at the end of each chapter, encouraging the reader to think for themselves.

Ambedkar wrote the book during 1954–1955, but delayed its publication because he could not find a photograph that he wanted to include in the book. Ultimately, he could not publish the book because of lack of funds. After his death in 1956, the manuscript of the book remained at his residence in Delhi, and ultimately came in the possession of the Government of Maharashtra. The Government published the book in 1987 as part of the Dr Babasaheb Ambedkar: Writings and Speeches (BAWS) series.

The contents of the book, especially an appendix titled The riddle of Rama and Krishna, led to a political controversy, with some Hindu organizations calling them derogatory to Hindu gods. In Ambedkar's home state Maharashtra, the Hindu-centric party Shiv Sena organized protests demanding the removal of the appendix, and the Maratha Mahamandal held a burning of the book. The Government withdrew the book temporarily, leading to counter-protests by Ambedkarite groups. Ultimately, the Government resumed the publication, with a disclaimer that it did not endorse the contents of the appendix.

== Publication history ==
In September 1951, Ambedkar resigned from the Nehru cabinet because of impasse over the Hindu Code Bill, leaving him without any official secretarial staff. He spent the last years of his life at 26 Alipur Road, a bungalow rented from the former ruler of the Sirohi State. There, Nanak Chand Rattu, a central government employee, worked for him after office hours, and typed several of his works, including the Riddles in Hinduism.

According to Rattu, Ambedkar wrote Riddles in Hinduism between the first week of January 1954 and the end of November 1955. Ambedkar asked Rattu to make four "press copies" of the manuscript, concerned that Hindu-owned presses would destroy the copies. Rattu states that the book was complete but its publication was delayed because Ambedkar was waiting for two photographs to be included in the book. The first photograph was that of India's first President Rajendra Prasad drinking water with which he had washed the feet of Brahmins at Varanasi in 1952. The second was that of India's first Prime Minister Jawahar Lal Nehru attending a yajna performed by Brahmins of Varanasi on 15 August 1947, to celebrate a Brahmin becoming the first Prime Minister. Ambedkar was able to find the photo of Prasad, but not the photo of Nehru.

During the last days of his life, Ambedkar wanted to publish seven books, including the Riddles in Hinduism, but did not have money to do so. He sought financial help from some industrialists and the government, and prioritized the publication of the Buddha and His Dhamma, which was published shortly after his death.

After Ambedkar's death in 1956, his wife Savita continued to live at 26 Alipur Road. Several papers containing Ambedkar's writings remained in a storeroom, and Rattu would dust and fumigate them occasionally. In 1966, a man named Madan Lal Jain purchased the bungalow, and rented two rooms to Savita Ambedkar. However, on 17 January 1967, he served her an eviction notice, and on 20 January, while she was away, entered her rooms accompanied by bailiffs and musclemen. These men dumped all of Ambedkar's papers in a yard, and several of these papers were destroyed in rain that night. Subsequently, Ambedkar's surviving papers came into the possession of the custodians of the Delhi High Court, and were later transferred to the Administrator General of the Government of Maharashtra.

Ambedkar's writings remained unpublished for several years. J.B. Bansod, a Dalit advocate, filed a lawsuit against the Government of Maharashtra, requesting access to Ambedkar's papers in order to publish them. In 1976, the Government established the Dr. Babasaheb Ambedkar Source Material Publication Committee to publish the papers. The Riddles in Hinduism was published in 1987, as part of the Volume 4 of Dr Babasaheb Ambedkar: Writings and Speeches (BAWS) series. The published text was based on manuscripts of the book's chapters found bundled in a file, with Ambedkar's handwritten alterations. The final manuscript, if any, has not survived. Ambedkar mentions the title Riddles in Hinduism in his introduction to the book. Ambedkar's original plan for the book included 24 "riddles", which changed often in blueprints. The manuscript file includes a table of contents, which does not match with the actual contents of the file. For example, the file has a chapter titled Riddles of Rama and Krishna, which is not mentioned in the table of contents.

In 1988, Bhadant Anand Kausalyayan translated the book into Hindi language as Hindu Dharma Ki Riddle. In 1995, the Government of India's Dr. Ambedkar Foundation published a Hindi translation by Sitaram Khodawal, as part of Volume 8 of the Hindi translation of the BAWS series. In 2016, author-publisher S. Anand and historian Shobhna Iyer published an annotated critical edition, based on the BAWS text.

== Contents ==
As suggested by the book's subtitle - An Exposition to Enlighten the Masses - Ambedkar intends to enlighten the Hindus. The Hinduism discussed by Ambedkar is "a complex congeries of creeds and doctrines" that has "no definite creed". According to Ambedkar, the Brahmin writers' works on Hinduism lack rational thinking, while Riddles in Hinduism appeals to the rational side of the Hindu mind. Ambedkar recognizes that the Hindus are capable of rational thinking, and ends each chapter with questions ("riddles") that provoke the reader to think for themselves.

The surviving manuscript contains over 170,000 words. It features several incomplete notes from Ambedkar and chapters with missing text. It comprises 24 "riddles" and 8 appendices, categorized as religious, social, or political.

=== Introduction ===
If the Hindu intellect has ceased to grow and if the Hindu civilization and culture has become a stagnant and stinking pool, this dogma [of the infallibility of the Vedas] must be destroyed root and branch if India is to progress. The Vedas are a worthless set of books. There is no reason either to call them sacred or infallible.

— B.R. Ambedkar in Riddles in Hinduism

In the introduction, Ambedkar describes the book as "an exposition of the beliefs propounded by what might be called Brahmanic theology". He states that he aims to encourage rational thinking among Hindus, and to show how the Brahmins have deceived and misguided the Hindus. He also states that the objective of the book is to challenge the sanatan (static) view of Hindu civilization propagated by European scholars and Brahmanic theology. He asserts that the Hindu civilization is not unchanging (sanatan): as an example, he states that the Brahmins stopped worshipping the Vedic gods when such worship became unprofitable for them, unlike the Jews who held on to their beliefs despite persecution. By challenging the characterization of the Hindu civilization as sanatan, Ambedkar intends to show that the Hindu society has seen radical changes in the past, and is capable of seeing more radical changes in the present and the future.

Ambedkar describes the Vedas - generally considered among the most sacred of the Hindu texts - as "worthless". He describes the Purusha Sukta as an interpolation in the Vedas, and states that the only reason the Brahmins portray the Vedas as infallible is because this hymn grants them superiority over others.

Ambedkar states that he is well aware of the risk of writing such a controversial book, but asserts that this is necessary to liberate the Hindu mind.

=== Part I: Religious ===
==== Riddle No. 1: The difficulty of knowing why one is a Hindu ====
Ambedkar discusses the vagueness of the term "Hindu": one cannot be called a Hindu for following a certain set of beliefs, because Hindu beliefs and practices vary widely (for example animal sacrifice and non-violence). He states that the Christians and the Muslims have more in common than the Hindus have in common with each other. Hindus include monotheists, polytheists and pantheists; even monotheist Hindus do not worship the same god. Several Hindus worship Muslim figures such as Pirs and Christian figures such as Mant Mauli. Ambedkar further states that the observance of the caste system does not make one a Hindu, because many Indian Christians and Indian Muslims also observe the caste system.

==== Riddle No. 2: The origin of the Vedas: The Brahmanic explanation or an exercise in the art of circumlocution ====
Ambedkar questions the origins of the Vedas, and discusses the Manusmriti commentator Kulluka Bhatta's description of the Vedas as "eternally pre-existing" (sanatana). According to Kulluka Bhatta, when the universe is dissolved in a pralaya, the Vedas are preserved in the memory of Brahma, and reproduced at the beginning of the each new era (kalpa). Ambedkar states that the Vedas could not have come into being ex-nihilo, and questions why the Brahmins do not openly state who created them.

==== Riddle No. 3: The testimony of other Shastras on the origin of the Vedas ====
Ambedkar states that the various Hindu texts offer 11 different mythical explanations for the origin of the Vedas, tracing their origin to different sources including Purusha, Prajapati, Indra and others. In his support, he quotes passages from several texts, including the Rig Veda samhita, the Atharva Veda samhita, the Brahmanas, the Upanishads, the Manu Smriti, and the various Puranas. Ambedkar asks why the Brahmin authors of these texts provide multiple "incoherent and chaotic" explanations about the origin of the Vedas.

==== Riddle No. 4: Why suddenly the Brahmans declare the Vedas to be infallible and not to be questioned? ====
Ambedkar states that the Brahmins describe the Vedas as apaurusheya (not man-made) and infallible texts, whose authority cannot be questioned. He then quotes various Dharma Sutras to illustrate that the Vedas were not always considered the sole infallible authorities. In the surviving text, Ambedkar intends to present a quote from the Shatapatha Brahmana, but the quote and the subsequent discussion is missing.

==== Riddle No. 5: Why did the Brahmans go further and declare that the Vedas are neither made by man nor by god? ====
Ambedkar states that the Vedas cannot be apaurusheya (not man-made), since the Anukramanis provide a list of sages who composed the various Vedic hymns. He also quotes some hymns from the Rig Veda, in which various sages describe themselves as composers of the hymns. He quotes ancient philosophers who considered the Vedas as authoritative because they were a product of competent and intelligent humans, thus confirming their non-divine origin. Ambedkar then discusses Jaimini's "absurd" explanations for the claim that the "Vedas are eternal and not made by man, not even by God." He questions why did the Brahmins like Jaimini make such "desperate" attempts to establish "a desperate conclusion".

==== Riddle No. 6: The contents of the Vedas: Have they any moral or spiritual value? ====
Ambedkar questions the ethical and spiritual value of the Vedas, quoting various scholars, including Charvaka and Brahaspati, according to whom the Vedas are simply the means of livelihood for priests who are devoid of knowledge and manliness. He presents various quotes from the Rig Veda about incest, soma intoxication and violence. Ambedkar states that he has not quoted many obscene verses from the Vedas, but urges the interested readers to check them: Rig Veda 10.85.37 (conversation between Surya and Pushan), Rig Veda 10.86.6 (conversation between Indra and Indrani), and the Ashvamedha section of the Yajur Veda. He then presents an extract of the table of contents of the Atharva Veda, stating that three-fourths of the text is about black magic and sorcery. He states that even the Rig Veda contains black magic and sorcery, presenting quotes in his support. He concludes that the Vedas contain nothing "spiritually or morally elevating", and questions why the Brahmins present them as sacred and infallible texts.

==== Riddle No. 7: The turn of the tide, or how did the Brahmans declare the Vedas to be lower than the lowest of their Shastras? ====
Ambedkar questions why certain Hindu texts such as the Veda samhitas were classified as shruti (revelation), while the others were not. First, he discusses the Smriti texts, stating that originally they were not recognized as part of the Dharma Shastra literature, but later, the Brahmins gave them a status equal or even superior to that of the Vedas. In his support, Ambedkar quotes historian A.S. Altekar, presenting examples where the Vedas and the Smritis are in conflict (for example, the Vedic texts prohibit suicide, but the Smritis support the custom of Sati).

Ambedkar discusses the various "artificial, ingenious and desperate" arguments provided by Brahmin scholars to support the high status of the Smritis (for example, Kumarila Bhatta's theory that the Smritis may have been based on a lost Shruti text). Ambedkar then presents quotes from the various Puranas declaring their equality with or superiority over the Vedas. Finally, Ambedkar discusses the Tantra texts, whom certain sects consider equal or superior to the Vedas. Ambedkar questions why did the Brahmins grant higher status to other texts over the Vedas.

==== Riddle No. 8: How the Upanishads declared war on the Vedas? ====
Ambedkar questions the belief that the Vedas and the Upanishads are complementary texts from a single system of thought. He quotes various sources to show that the Upanishads were originally not considered a part of the Vedic literature. He then quotes various Upanishads to show that they were often in opposition to the Vedas, and even considered the Vedas as inferior. Ambedkar states that at one time the Vedic Brahmins held the Upanishads in low esteem, quoting the Dharma Sutras of Baudhayana in his support.

==== Riddle No. 9: How the Upanishads came to be made subordinate to the Vedas? ====
The original title of this chapter was "Jaimini versus Badarayana" after two ancient scholars. Ambedkar describes Jaimini as an upholder of the Vedas, and Badarayana as an upholder of the Upanishads. Ambedkar quotes Shankaracharya's commentary on their works to explain their opposing views. Jaimini declared that a man's self can go to heaven only if he performs Vedic ritual sacrifices. Badarayana states that the performance of sacrifices (karma-kanda) is necessary only for those who believe in the Vedas; it is not necessary for those who have the knowledge of the self (jnana-kanda) from the Upanishads. While Jaimini denounces Badarayana's beliefs as false and delusional, Badarayana concedes that Jaimini's beliefs have scriptural authority while insisting that his beliefs also have scriptural authority. Ambedkar criticizes Badarayana for his weak response, and asks why did he not question the infallibility of the Vedas.

==== Riddle No. 10: Why did the Brahmans make the Hindu gods fight against one another? ====
Ambedkar states that the concept of Trimurti suggests that the Hindu gods Brahma, Vishnu, and Shiva work collaboratively. However, the various legends manufactured by the followers of these gods show them engaging in feuds. For example, in a Skanda Purana story, Shiva cuts off Brahma's fifth head in support of Vishnu's claim that he was the first born among the gods. In a Ramayana story, Brahma creates enmity between Vishnu and Shiva, and in the end, the gods and the sages declare Vishnu to be superior. Ambedkar states that the concept of avatars was first associated with Brahma, and was appropriated by Vishnu's followers. Brahma's cult declined in India because of defamatory attacks from the followers of the other gods. For example, the Vaishnavite text Bhagavata Purana accuses Brahma of committing adultery with his own daughter, resulting in admonishment from sages. The Puranas are full of propaganda and counter-propaganda by Vaishnavites and Shaivites aiming to prove the supremacy of their favorite god. According to Ambedkar while the existence of polytheism in the Hindu society is understandable, the existence of combats and feuds among the various gods requires explanation.

==== Riddle No. 11: Why did the Brahmans make the Hindu gods suffer to rise and fall? ====
Poor creatures, they became nothing more than mere toys in the hands of the Brahmins. Why did the Brahmins treat the Gods with so scant a respect?

— B.R. Ambedkar on the Hindu gods, in Riddles in Hinduism

Ambedkar briefly discusses two common criticisms of Hinduism, idolatry and polytheism, comparing these to the similar practices in other faiths. For example, he mentions that unlike Buddhists (who are also idolatrous), the Hindus endow an idol with the functions of a human being using the prana-pratishtha ceremony. According to him, instead of idolatry and polytheism, Hindus should be criticized for not being loyal to their gods: they regularly abandon their old gods and start worshipping the new ones.

Ambedkar states that an earlier hymn of the Rig Veda accords equal status to all the gods, but later hymns variously name Indra, Soma, or Varuna as the greatest god. The Shatapatha Brahmana similarly states that originally all the gods were alike, but later Agni, Indra and Surya became superior. A list of various sects prevalent in India, given in the Buddhist text Chula Niddesa, suggests that many ancient gods were abandoned and replaced by other gods in the later period. According to Ambedkar, the literature of the Brahmins does not explain why new gods such as Shiva and Vishnu replaced the older gods such as Agni and Indra.

Quoting a Bhagavata Purana legend about Shiva's destruction of Daksha's yajna, Ambedkar states that Shiva was originally an anti-Vedic god. He then quotes Chhandogya Upanishad and its commentary to assert that Ghora Angiras taught anti-Vedic doctrine to Krishna. Ambedkar points out that Rama is not mentioned in the Vedas, and wonders what was the necessity to start his cult at a later stage. He then states that even the relatively newer gods - Brahma, Vishnu, and Shiva - were later ranked lower than a goddess, as attested by Devi Bhagavatam.

Ambedkar then discusses Rama and Krishna, stating that the stories of them being incarnations of Vishnu were probably invented to confer godhood on men. He then quotes various passages from the Mahabharata (including the Bhagavad Gita) to assert that the text variously declares Krishna to be superior or inferior to Shiva. He then quotes the Ramayana, stating that there was an attempt to degrade Rama below the Brahmin hero Parashurama.

==== Riddle No. 12: Why did the Brahmans dethrone the gods and enthrone the goddesses? ====
This chapter was originally titled Vedic and non-Vedic Goddesses. Ambedkar states that the Hindus have worshipped goddesses since the beginning, listing several goddesses from the Rigveda. He then lists various goddesses from the Puranas, and quotes several Hindu texts to point out that these are variously considered to be either distinct goddesses, or different names or forms of the same divinity.

According to Ambedkar, the Vedic goddesses were worshipped out of courtesy, simply because they were wives of the gods. Although the Vedic literature describes several conflicts against the asuras, the goddesses do not participate in these conflicts. Ambedkar then cites various Puranic stories to assert that the Puranic goddesses were worshipped in their own right, for performing heroic deeds such as killing asuras. Ambedkar asks why the Puranic goddesses were assigned more powerful roles compared to the Vedic goddesses. He also asks why certain Puranic goddesses such as Sarasvati and Lakshmi do not participate in the conflicts against the asuras.

Ambedkar then quotes the Markandeya Purana to state that the Brahmins made their gods look imbecile cowards, whose wives had to rescue them against the asuras. Ambedkar asks if the Brahmins started the worship of the goddesses to put "a new commodity on the market".

==== Riddle No. 13: The riddle of the ahimsa ====
In the table of contents of Ambedkar's manuscript, the Riddle No. 13 was originally titled "How the Brahmans who were once cow-killers became the worshippers of the cow?"

Ambedkar states that various vices were common among the Vedic Aryans, such as gambling; "loose" sex relations (including incest, wife sharing, prostitution, and bestiality); and drinking. He quotes sacred texts and cites examples to support this assertion. He then states that the biggest change that has taken place in the Hindu society is the diet: several Hindus now practice vegetarianism, or follow other dietary restrictions such as not eating the cow flesh. According to Ambedkar, no Hindu kills animals for food, and the non-vegetarian Hindus rely on Muslim butchers: even the untouchable Hindus who eat beef do not kill a cow, and only eat the flesh of a dead cow. He cites various texts to assert that the ancient Vedic Aryans - even Brahmins - ate meat of all kinds of animals including cow.

The rest of the text is missing from the manuscript.

==== Riddle No. 14: From ahimsa back to himsa ====
The previous chapter, incomplete in the surviving manuscript, presumably described how the Hindu society moved from himsa (violence) to ahimsa (non-violence). In Riddle No. 14, Ambedkar describes the alleged reversal of this process. He refers to the Tantric concept of pancha-makara, in which meat and alcohol are part of the worship. He discusses the prevalence of Tantric worship in India, and states that the Brahmins promoted it despite its non-conformance to the Vedas and the Manusmriti. For example, Kulluka Bhatta, a commentator on Manusmriti, states that the Shruti (revelation) is of two types: Vedic and Tantric. Ambedkar then quotes the Matrika Bheda Tantra, in which Shiva tells Parvati that the Brahmins need to drink wine to achieve salvation. Ambedkar asks why did the Brahmins start drinking alcohol and eating flesh.

==== Riddle No. 15: How did the Brahmans wed an ahimsak god to a bloodthirsty goddess? ====
Ambedkar states that after approving the consumption of alcohol and meat, the Brahmins wrote the Puranas advocating animal sacrifices. He quotes the Rudhir Adhhyaya ("The Bloody Chapter") of the Kali Purana, which recommends animal and human sacrifice to please the goddess Kali. As an example of the prevalence of animal sacrifice among the Hindus, Ambedkar mentions the Kali Temple in Calcutta, stating that hundreds of goats are sacrificed there daily. He further states that the Hindus practised human sacrifice in the past, quoting historian Rajendralal Mitra. Ambedkar then quotes the Asvalayana-grihya-sutra to state that the Hindus used to sacrifice bull to appease Shiva. He states that the Shaivites later became non-violent, but started characterizing Shiva's wife Kali as violent. He asks why the Brahmins did such a thing.

==== Appendix I: The riddle of the Vedas ====
This appendix consolidates the matter of the riddles 2–6. Ambedkar discusses the authorship and the changing authority of the Vedas.

==== Appendix II: The riddle of the Vedanta ====
This appendix consolidates the matter of the riddles 8–9. Ambedkar states that the Hindus today regard Vedanta (the philosophy of the Upanishads) as India's most important contribution to the world's philosophical thought. However, originally, the Vedanta was considered "repugnant and hostile to the Vedas", and the Upanishads were not considered a part of the Vedic literature. He provides several quotes, including from the Upanishads, in his support. Ambedkar then quotes Charvaka and Brahaspati, and asks why the Vedic Brahmans compromised with the Vedantists but not with these scholars. Finally, he discusses the opposing views of Jaimini and Badarayana over the authority of the Upanishads.

==== Appendix III: The riddle of the Trimurti ====
This appendix consolidates material from Riddle No. 10-11. Ambedkar provides a list of various sects prevalent in India in the past, from the Buddhist text Chula Niddesa. He discusses the decline of older gods and the rise of new cults, and also discusses the possibility of Shiva originally being a non-Aryan god. Ambedkar then states that in the Taittiriya Samhita of the Yajur Veda, Rudra (later identified with Shiva) is described as the king of thieves and robbers, and asks why the Brahmins accepted him as their supreme god. He then states that Rudra was a violent god, but the Brahmins made his adaptation Shiva a non-violent god. Next, Ambedkar quotes Indologist R.N. Dandekar's essay Vishnu in the Veda to assert that phallus worship was originally associated with Vishnu, and was later appropriated for Shiva in the Puranas.

Ambedkar then discusses a legend about the birth of the god Dattatreya. In this story, the wives of the Trimurti gods - Sarasvati, Lakshmi, and Parvati - each claim to be the most chaste woman. Sage Narada recounts their acts of adultery, and describes Anusuya as the most chaste woman instead. Feeling humiliated, the three women convince their husbands to try seducing Anusuya, in order to prove Narada wrong. The husbands fail to do so, and instead their bodies fuse together resulting in the formation of Dattatreya. Ambedkar states that this "immoral" story illustrates that the three Trimurti gods had equal status at a time.

Ambedkar then cites various mythological stories to assert that the Brahmin devotees of Brahma, Vishnu, and Shiva engaged in a "systematic campaign of vilification and degradation" against each other, resulting in the decline of the Brahma's cult. He asks if the Brahmins engaged in such sectarian conflicts for political reasons.

==== Appendix IV: Smarth Dharma and Tantrik Dharma ====
The Hindu religion is nothing but worshipping so many Gods and Goddesses, worshipping so many trees, visiting so many places of pilgrimage and making offerings to the Brahmins. Was the religion formulating for enabling the Brahmins to earn their living?

— B.R. Ambedkar in Riddles in Hinduism

This appendix is divided into three parts, but several of its pages are missing. The surviving manuscript has pages from Part II - Smarth Dharma and Part III - Tantrik Dharma. Part I was presumably about Shrauta Dharma (the religion of the Shrauta texts).

In Part II, Ambedkar discusses the dogmas of the Smarth Dharma (Smarta tradition), whose sacred literature consists of the Smritis or the law books. He mentions the first two dogmas: the belief in the Trimurti, and the recognition of the Sanskaras (rites). The next few pages are missing from the surviving manuscript. Next, Ambedkar discusses the god Yama, whom the Puranas assign the role of punishing the wicked after the death. He asserts that the Shrauta Dharma does not assign such powers to Yama. According to Ambedkar, in the Pauranik Dharma (the religion of the Puranas), a sin refers to the non-performance of ritual performances rather than performance of morally wrong deeds, and the Puranas offer expiation for such sins.

In Part III, Ambedkar describes the Tantrik Dharma (Shaktism or the religion of the Tantras) as an extension of the Pauranik Dharma, but centered around goddesses. He states that originally different goddesses, including consorts of the male gods, were worshipped; later, these were all consolidated and described as the different manifestations of Shakti, the female energy of Shiva. Ambedkar discusses the concepts of Mahavidyas, Matrikas, Nayikas, Yoginis, Dakinis, and Sakinis. He then describes Kali as the most terrible manifestation of the Shakti. The next two pages are missing, after which Ambedkar states that the Tantrik worship considers "the fullest satisfaction of the carnal desires of man" as the best form of worship, and is very different from Shrauta or Pauranik worship. He then discusses the immorality of the pancha-makara rituals, which involve drinking and sexual intercourse.

Ambedkar mentions that religion started with questions on topics such as the nature of the self, the creation of the universe, the definition of good life that pleases the god etc. However, these questions have now been "taken over by theology, metaphysics, philosophy and ethics". In particular, Hinduism has been reduced to a means for the Brahmins earn a living.

==== Appendix V: The infallibility of the Vedas ====
Ambedkar presents passages from the Shatapatha Brahmana and the Manusmriti, which glorify the Vedas as authoritative texts to be read every day. The rest of the chapter is missing in the surviving manuscript.

=== Part II: Social ===
==== The riddle of women: Why did the Brahmins degrade the Indian women? ====
The BAWS editors excluded this chapter from the Riddles in Hinduism, because it was already included in BAWS Series 3 as Chapter 17: The Woman and the Counter-Revolution. In this chapter, Ambedkar quotes Manusmriti to state that Manu had a low opinion of women, and wanted to deprive them of the freedom they had under the Buddhist rule. Ambedkar mentions several examples of Manu's misogyny, such as according slave-like treatment to a wife in the matter of property, allowing a husband to beat his wife, and prohibiting women from reading the Vedas.

Ambedkar states that before Manu, Indian women were considered equal to men in status, were highly respected, and had access to the highest learning and education. In his support, he cites the writings of various scholars including Panini and Patanjali, and provides examples of ancient women such as Gargi and Maitreyi, among others. He quotes the Arthashastra and other texts to assert that before Manu, Indian women married after reaching puberty; monogamy was generally considered ideal; women could seek divorce; the widows could remarry; and women were economically independent. Ambedkar questions why Manu made laws restricting such rights of women.

==== Riddle No. 16: The four varnas: Are the Brahmans sure of their origin? ====
Ambedkar describes the varna system as a core feature of Hinduism, considered to be a divine order. He then discusses various explanations for the origin of the varnas, quoting passages from the Rig Veda (Purusha Sukta), the Vajasaneyi Samhita and the Taittiriya Samhita of the Yajur Veda, the Atharva Veda, the Shatapatha Brahmana, the Taittiriya Brahmana, the Manusmriti, the Ramayana, the Mahabharata, the Vishnu Purana, the Harivamsa, the Bhagavata Purana, and the Vayu Purana.

He notes that these texts offer different explanations for the origin of the varnas; in fact, some of these texts offer multiple, contradictory explanations. Ambedkar asks why the Brahmins could not give a uniform and consistent explanation about the origin of the varnas. Moreover, the different texts disagree about the equality of the varnas. Ambedkar states that the Brahmins concocted the theory of the varnas and inserted it into the Rigveda, contrary to established traditions, resulting in this "chaos". He questions the motive of the Brahmins who did this.

==== Riddle No. 17: The four ashramas: The why and how about them ====
Ambedkar discusses the ashrama system which divides the life of an individual into four stages: Brahmacharya (student), Grihastha (householder), Vanaprastha (forest-dweller), and Sannyasa (renunciate). He describes three features of the ashrama system mentioned in the Manusmriti: (1) it is not open to the Shudras and the women (2) the Brahmacharya and Grihastha stages are compulsory (3) one must follow the four stages in sequence. Ambedkar questions the need for this system, pointing out that the Vedas do not mention it.

Ambedkar then quotes the Vashistha Dharma Sutra and the Gautama Dharma Sutra, which unlike the Manusmriti, state that a person can enter any of the ashramas without needing to go through the previous stages. He states that a Brahmachari who did not wish to marry immediately had the option of becoming an Aranas (or Aranamanas) in order to continue his studies. Manu removed this option, and dictated that a Brahmachari must pass through the subsequent stages to enter the Sannyasa stage. According to Manu, a man who seeks the final liberation without having children "sinks downwards". Ambedkar questions why Manu "made escape from marriage impossible".

Ambedkar also questions the need for the Vanaprastha stage, stating that it overlaps with the Grihastha and the Sannyasa stages.

==== Riddle No. 18: Manu's madness or the Brahmanic explanation of the origin of the mixed castes ====
The caste of Chandala is said by Manu to be the progeny of illegitimate intercourse between a Shudra male and a Brahman female. Can this be true? It means that Brahmin women must have been very lax in their morality and must have had special sexual attraction for the Shudra. This is unbelievable. So vast is the Chandala population that even if every Brahmin female was a mistress of a Shudra it could not account of the vast number of Chandalas in the country.

— B.R. Ambedkar in Riddles in Hinduism

Ambedkar discusses the various categories of castes mentioned in the Manusmriti, and then focuses the discussion on the mixed (sankara) castes. Manusmriti gives a list of various combinations of mixed-caste parentage, and classifies them as anuloma (acceptable) or pratiloma (condemned). For example, the child of a Vaishya father and a Kshatriya mother is called "Magadha" and is classified as pratiloma. Later authors have made several additions to the list.

Ambedkar notes that Manu does not list all the possible combinations of mixed-caste parentage, and wonders if he was afraid of mentioning certain combinations for some reason. He also states that some of the mixed-caste names in the list appear to be fictitious. Plus, Manu and other authors disagree over several mixed-caste combinations. For example, the child of a Vaishya father and a Kshatriya mother is called "Ayogava" in Aushanas Smriti and "Pukkasa" in Brihad-Vishnu Smriti.

Ambedkar describes Manu's explanation of the origin of the mixed castes as historically inaccurate, giving several examples. For example, the Magadhas were the residents of the Magadha region, not people of mixed Vaishya-Kshatriya origin. Ambedkar accuses Manu and later authors of perverting history and defaming respectable tribes as bastards. He questions the reason behind this "madness", stating that the Brahmins' attempts to impose the varna system rules against mixed-caste marriages must have failed, and Manu had to invent explanations for the existence of a large number of castes that did not fit in any of the four varnas. Ambedkar states that if Manu is right in ascribing the origin of the populous Chandala caste to illegitimate sexual intercourse between Shudra males and Brahman females, such forbidden relationships must have been very common. Ambedkar wonders if Manu realized that he was assigning "an ignoble origin to a vast number of the people of this country leading to their social and moral degradation."

==== Riddle No. 19: The change from paternity to maternity: What did the Brahmans wish to gain by it? ====
Ambedkar discusses the eight types of marriage and the 13 types of sons recognized in the Hindu law. He describes many of these relationships as "euphemisms for seduction and rape"; for example, the Paishacha marriage is a euphemism for rape, and described as lawful for a Vaishya and a Shudra. He also states that the existence of these categories shows that the Brahmin attempts to restrict the society to only certain types of permissible marriages had failed.

Ambedkar states that Manu made a few changes to the prevalent social norms while establishing rules about various types of marriages and sons. For example, Manu excludes certain types of sons (such as those born out of Shudra women) from inheritance. Ambedkar also states that before Manu, only the varna of the father determined the child's varna. Moreover, the male head of the family - not the biological father - owned the illegitimate children of his wife. Ambedkar wonders why Manu changed the traditional law.

==== Riddle No. 20: Kali Varjya or the Brahmanic art of suspending the operation of sin without calling it sin ====
Ambedkar discusses the dogma of Kali-varjya ("Kali Varja"), which is codified in the Aditya Purana. According to this dogma, certain practices are forbidden in the Kali Yuga (the current age), but permissible in the other yugas. Ambedkar lists several examples of such customs, including widow remarriage and sacrificial killing of cows (gomedha). The Kali-varjya dogma forbids these practices but does not condemn them or provide any reason for forbidding them. Ambedkar states that these practices are not immoral, sinful or otherwise harmful to the society, as evident from the fact that they are allowed in the other yugas. He asks why did the Brahmins came up with "this technique of forbidding a practice without condemning it."

==== Appendix I: The riddle of the Varnashrama Dharma ====
These explanations [justifying the existence of the varna system] are like effusions of the imbeciles. They show how hard the Brahmins were put to for the defence of the varna system. The question is why were the Brahmins not able to give a consistent and uniform unimpeachable, convincing and rational explanation of the varna system of which they have been such strong protagonists?

— B.R. Ambedkar on the varna system, in Riddles in Hinduism

This appendix consolidates the matter or Riddles 16–17. Ambedkar discusses the varna system and the ashrama systems, collectively called the Varnashram Dharma. Ambedkar asks why Manu prohibits a Brahmachari from entering the Sannyasa ashrama without going through the life of a householder. He states that compulsory marriage without any consideration to wealth or health of a person would lead to personal and national ruin, unless the state guaranteed subsistence to everybody.

Ambedkar quotes various texts on the origin of the varna system, and discusses the explanations offered for the existence of the varna system, including the one attributed to Krishna in the Bhagavad Gita. He dismisses these explanations as absurd, and concludes that the Brahmins have been unable to offer any reasonable explanation on the topic.

Ambedkar then discusses the ashrama system, and criticizes it as a stupid attempt at a planned economy, saying that it cut off old men from their families.

==== Appendix II: Compulsory matrimony ====
This appendix overlaps with and supplements the Riddle No. 17 and Appendix I. Ambedkar criticizes Manu for making marriage compulsory for a Brahmachari, and questions the need for the Vanaprastha ashrama.

=== Part III: Political ===
==== Riddle No. 21: The theory of Manvantara ====
Ambedkar describes the concept of Manvantara as an undemocratic government run by a corporation comprising an officer called Manu, an officer called Indra, and the seven sages (Saptarishis). He then quotes Vishnu Purana passages describing the past, the current, and the future Manvantaras. He notes that according to the Vishnu Purana, Brahma created Svayambhuva Manu (the first Manu) and his wife Shatarupa from himself: Ambedkar asks if this means that Brahma was a hermaphrodite, and if the first Manu married his sister. Ambedkar then quotes Manusmriti passages that describe the creation of the world, and the creation of the sacred law by Svayambhuva Manu. He asks if Svayambhuva was the only Manu who created the eternal law, or if each Manvantara had its own laws.

==== Riddle No. 22: Brahma is not Dharma: What good is Brahma? ====
Ambedkar mentions the various forms of Government, and discusses different definitions of democracy. He intends to quote John Dewey's Democracy and Education, but the surviving manuscript is missing the actual quotes. Ambedkar states that a democratic government can succeed only in a democratic society: if a society is divided into groups such as castes, and the citizens promote interests of their own group over the interests of the society, the democratic government will fail. According to Ambedkar, a democratic society is not possible without fraternity (as the French revolutionists call it) or "maitri" (as the Buddha calls it).

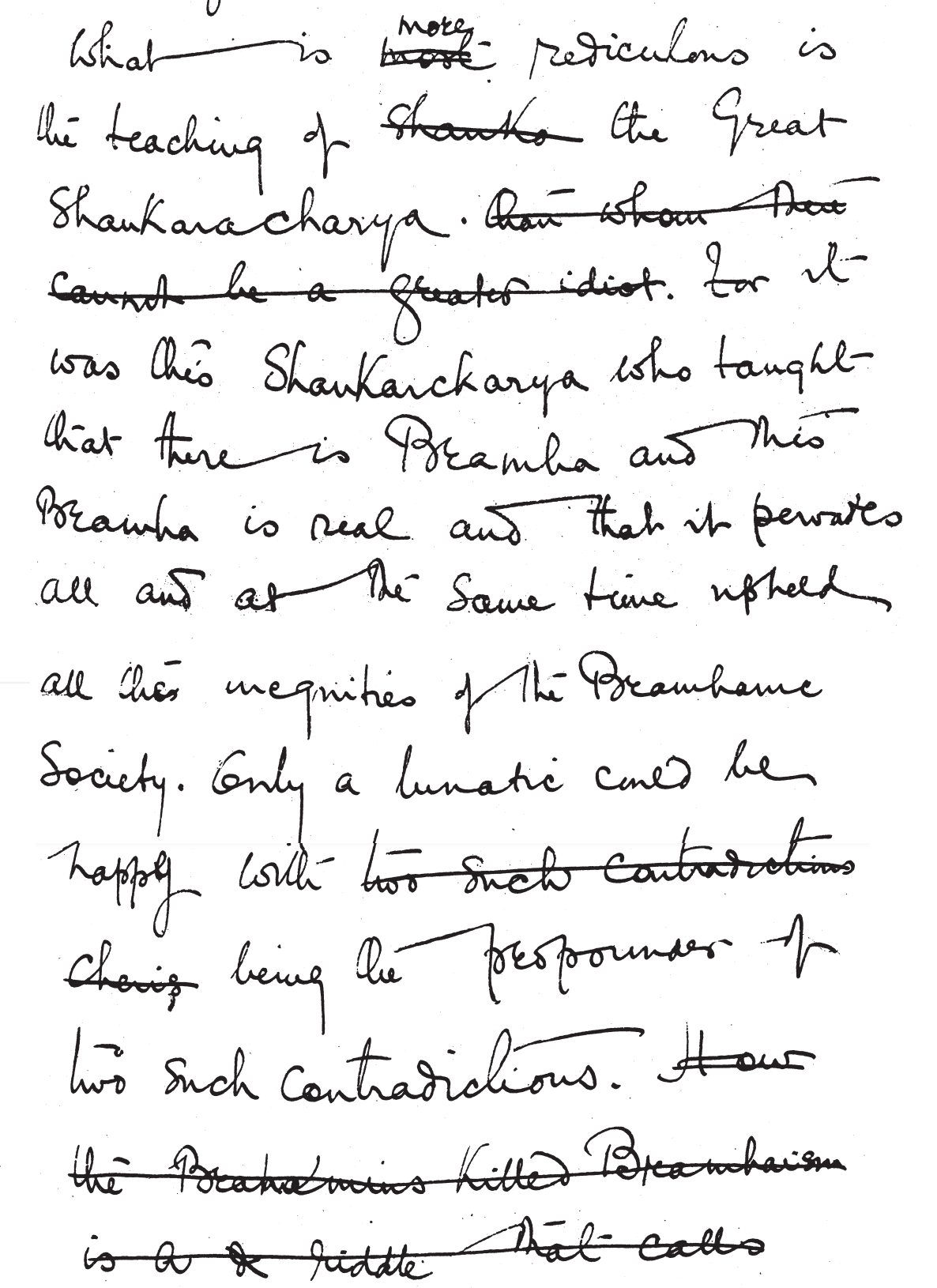
Sample of BR Ambedkar's handwriting from the Riddles in Hinduism manuscript: "What is more ridiculous is the teaching of the Great Shankaracharya. For it was this Shankaracharya who taught that there is Brahma and this Brahma is real and that it pervades all and at the same time upheld all the inequities of the Brahmanic society. Only a lunatic could be happy with being the propounder of two such contradictions."

Ambedkar states that religion of a society is the main source of its fraternity. Hinduism, instead of teaching fraternity, promotes the division of society into classes (varnas). Ambedkar then discusses the Hindu philosophical concept of "Brahmaism", according to which everything and everyone is "of the essence of Brahma". According to him, this concept suggests that all persons are equal, since all are parts of Brahma. He states that Brahmaism had greater potential than the idea of fraternity to produce a social democracy, but Brahmins did not allow that to happen because they did not support equality between the various social classes and the genders.

==== Riddle No. 23: Kali Yuga: Why have the Brahmans made it unending? ====
Ambedkar describes the concept of Kali Yuga, stating that its characterization as the immoral age has a psychological effect on the people's mind. He discusses various theories about the original meaning of the term yuga, and the different dates proposed for the start of the Kali Yuga. Quoting Garga's Siddhanta, the Mahabharata, and the Vishnu Purana, Ambedkar argues that the Kali Yuga lasted for 1000 years and ended in the 2nd century CE. He states that Brahmins later claimed that Kali Yuga has not ended, and invented various explanations to support their claim; for example, they say that it is supposed to last for 1000 divine years, with 1 divine day being equal to 1 human year.

Ambedkar states that the Vedic religion was "full of barbaric and obscene observances" such as human sacrifice, worship of the genitals (skambha), and the Ashvamedha rite of inserting the penis of a dead horse into a queen's vagina. He portrays the ancient Aryan society as immoral, giving examples of gambling (such as the Pandavas putting their wife Draupadi at stake); alcoholism (including Soma intoxication); and promiscuity (including incest, sale of women, polygamy and polyandry, and niyoga). Ambedkar quotes several texts in his support, stating that even Brahmins, Rishis, and Devas engaged in these vices (according to Ambedkar, the Devas were a human group similar to the Aryans and the Dasyus, not supernatural beings).

Ambedkar states that all these instances of immorality had taken place before the start of the Kali Yuga, which looks better from a moral perspective. Ambedkar asks if the Brahmins extended Kali Yuga to blackmail Shudra kings by destroying their subjects' faith in their rule in a purportedly immoral age.

==== Riddle No. 24: The riddle of the Kali Yuga ====
Quoting various texts, Ambedkar discusses various Hindu units of time. Ambedkar states that the names of the four yugas derive from gambling-related terms, and their meaning changed over time. Ambedkar asks why did the Brahmins invented the theory of Kali Yuga, and described it as the age of degradation. He states that according to Brahmins, only the Brahmin and the Shudra varnas exist in the Kali Yuga. He also discusses Kali-varjya, earlier described in the Riddle No. 20. Ambedkar asks why the Brahmins invented these concepts.

==== Appendix I: The riddle of Rama and Krishna ====
===== Part I: Rama =====
Ambedkar summarizes the story of Valmiki's Ramayana, stating that Rama's birth was marked by "general debauchery". According to the Ramayana, Rama's father Dasharatha performed a Putreshti yajna ritual, in which the sage Shringa ("Shrung") gave pindas to Dasharatha's wives. The god Vishnu was born as Rama to one of the wives as a result. Ambedkar describes this birth as unnatural, and states that the story is possibly a euphemism for Shringa being the biological father of Rama (see niyoga). He states that according to the Ramayana, its various characters (such as the vanaras) were born when, at Brahma's command, the gods engaged in "wholesale acts of fornication" with apsaras (whom Ambedkar describes as prostitutes), unmarried women, and wives of other beings.

Ambedkar states that according to Valmiki's Ramayana, Rama's wife Sita was found by a farmer in a field as a baby, and presented to king Janaka, who adopted her. Ambedkar finds this story unconvincing, and instead refers to Buddha Ramayana (Dasaratha Jataka), according to which Sita was a sister of Rama. He states that the Buddha Ramayana story seems more "natural and not inconsistent with the Aryan rules of marriage": if true, the incestuous marriage of Rama and Sita should not be regarded as an ideal.

Ambedkar disputes the Ramayana's characterization of Rama as a virtuous and illustrious man, stating that he is not worthy of deification. He calls Rama's modern characterization as a monogamous man incorrect, stating that Valmiki refers to many wives of Rama in the Ayodhya Kanda 8.12.

Ambedkar discusses Rama's character as an individual, describing his mistreatment of Vali and Sita. He describes Rama's killing of Vali as a cowardly act and an unprovoked, premeditated murder. Ambedkar notes that after killing his wife's captor Ravana, Rama did not immediately visit her, instead spending time on other tasks such as the coronation of Vibhishana. When he finally met Sita for the first time in several months, he told her that he had killed Ravana to recover his honour and not for her sake. Rama then doubted Sita's chastity, stating that Ravana would not have failed to have sex with her. A dejected Sita declared that she would have committed suicide before meeting him if she was aware of such thoughts of Rama. After Sita proved her chastity by a fire test, Rama took her back to his capital Ayodhya. When Sita became pregnant, Rama abandoned her because of public rumors that she was carrying Ravana's child, although he was personally convinced of Sita's chastity. According to Ambedkar, Hindus cite this incident to portray Rama as a democratic king, arguing that he cared about the public opinion; however, it only proves that he was a cowardly and weak monarch who cared more about his name and fame rather than doing the right thing as a king and a husband. Rama then tricked Sita into visiting the hermitage of Valmiki, and had Lakshmana abandon her there. Sita gave birth to his two sons there, but he never visited them. After 12 years, he invited many sages to a yajna, but did not invite Valmiki. Nevertheless, Valmiki arrived there, and introduced him to his two sons. Later, Sita also visited him, but preferred to die by burying herself into the earth rather than returning to Rama. Ambedkar describes Rama's treatment of Sita as cruel.

Next, Ambedkar discusses Rama as a king. Ambedkar states that Valmiki's detailed descriptions of Rama's daily life do not suggest that he was involved in administration or attended to public affairs. Instead, Rama spent time on religious rites, enjoying company of court jesters and women, drinking and eating (including flesh). In his support, Ambedkar cites Uttara Kanda 42.27, 43.1, and 42.8. Ambedkar states that Ramayana mentions only one instance of Rama listening to a public grievance: the episode of Shambuka. According to this story, a Brahmin blamed the premature death of his son on a sin committed in Rama's kingdom. After consultations, Rama concluded that this sin was the performance of sacred tapasya by Shambuka, a Shudra. According to the sacred law (dharma), only the upper class twice-born people could perform such tapasya, and Shudras were restricted to serving them. Rama then condemned and killed Shambuka, and the Brahmin's dead son came back to life. The gods and the sage Agastya praised Rama for this deed. Ambedkar calls this "the worst crime that history has ever recorded".

===== Part II: Krishna =====
Ambedkar then discusses Krishna, describing him as the hero of the Mahabharata. According to him, the Mahabharata originally contained only the story of the Pandavas, and Krishna's story was inserted into the text at a later stage. Ambedkar disputes the characterization of Krishna as a god, and discusses various legends about him from texts such as the Mahabharata, the Harivamsa, and some Puranas. He describes the vastra-harana episode as obscene: according to this legend, Krishna seized the clothes of Gopis while they were bathing in the Yamuna River, and forced them to come out naked and beg to him for returning the clothes. He describes Krishna's Rasalila as "illicit intimacy" with young women, dismissing its interpretation as pious love to god. Ambedkar calls Krishna's relationship with Radha as his most indecent act, stating that Krishna was married to Rukmini while Radha (according to some texts) was married to another man.

Ambedkar describes Krishna's acts as a warrior and a politician immoral, presenting summaries of various legends about him. For example, Ambedkar states that Krishna instigated Arjuna to carry off Subhadra without waiting for a husband-choosing ceremony (svayamvara), and instigated Bhima to unfairly strike Duryodhana below the navel in a combat. Ambedkar then describes Krishna's life as the ruler of Dvaraka, referring to episodes of drunken singing and dancing with women, which modern Brahmins would find objectionable. Ambedkar states that after Krishna's own sons were killed during a drunken fight, he joined the fight and killed a large number of his own people.

== Reception ==
Soon after the publication of the book as part of the BAWS Volume 4 in 1987, its content - especially the appendix The riddle of Rama and Krishna - led to a political controversy. Madhav Gadkari, the editor of the Marathi language newspaper Loksatta, wrote in his column Chaufer that the appendix maligned Rama and Krishna. Through his columns, Gadkari campaigned for the controversial appendix to be deleted from the book.

Shiv Sena, a Hindu-centric political party, rioted in Mumbai asking for the appendix to be removed from the book. As a result, the Government of Maharashtra withdrew the book. This led to counter-protests across Maharashtra by thousands of Dalits. The Dalit Buddhist followers of Ambedkar and Buddhist monks wrote protest letters and newspaper articles, and participated in a march that was popularly called the "Bhim March". The controversy united various Dalit groups, who sought to protect Ambedkar's legacy.

The disturbances in Mumbai resulted in to damage to private and public properties, and the defacement of the Martyrs' Memorial at the Hutatma Chowk. The Government deployed policemen to prevent defacement of Ambedkar's statues across the city. As a compromise, the Government resumed the publication with a disclaimer that it did not concur with the views expressed in the chapter.

The publication of the book became a major issue in the 1987 Vile Parle by-poll, which was a turning point in the Hindutva politics. Shiv Sena, which was not formally recognized by the Election Commission at the time, fielded Ramesh Prabhoo as an independent candidate. The Bharatiya Janata Party (BJP) - which later came to be identified with Hindutva - supported a Janata Dal candidate who championed secularism. The Shiv Sena chief Bal Thackeray made several controversial speeches, seeking votes in name of religion. In one such speech, he complained, "Though this country belongs to Hindus, Ram and Krishna are insulted." Prabhoo won the election, and Thackeray described the result as the victory of Rama and Krishna and as a licence for the formation of a Hindu Rashtra. The defeated Indian National Congress candidate Prabhakar Kunte argued that Thackeray's communal speeches amounted to corrupt practices under the Representation of the People Act, 1951. He took the matter to the Bombay High Court, which declared the election void. The Supreme Court upheld this decision, and the Election Commission banned Thackeray from voting for 6 years. Nevertheless, Shiv Sena continued its Hindutva politics, winning the Aurangabad civic body elections. Shiv Sena's success encouraged BJP to focus on the Hindutva politics as well.

The Maratha Mahamandal, an organisation of the Maratha caste, held a burning of the book at the organization's meeting in Amravati on 20 January 1988. Shashikant Pawar, the President of Maratha Mahasangha, condemned the Government's publication of the book.

S. V. Raju, in his Freedom First editorial (April 1988), criticized Shiv Sena for trying to suppress the freedom of expression. He stated that Ambedkar had cited "unimpeachable" sources to criticize Rama and Krishna, and Ambedkar's criticism was "mild" compared to what some others have said about Rama and Krishna. At the same time, Raju argued that the government should not have published the book, as the duty of the government is to govern not to publish books.

Raju pointed out that Rama's mistreatment of Vali, Shambuka and Sita has been criticized by many others, including C. Rajagopalachari who called it "disgraceful". Similarly, Gunvanthi Balarama, in an article in Bombay (December 1988), stated that various other leaders of Maharashtra had been "no less critical" of Hindu epics than Ambedkar; these leaders included Bal Thackeray's father Prabodhankar Thackeray.

Based on an analysis of Ambedkar's drafts, American academic Scott R. Stroud (2022) states that the book shows "Ambedkar's potential as an innovative thinker in the global history of rhetoric."

In 2023, Hamara Prasad, the founder of the Hindutva organization Rashtriya Dalita Sena stated that he would have shot Ambedkar for hurting Hindu sentiments by writing the Riddles in Hinduism. This led to a controversy, and the Telangana Police arrested him, charging him under the hate speech laws.
