= Nanak Chand Rattu =

- Born: 6 February 1922; Sakruli, Punjab, British India
- Died: 15 September 2002 (aged 80)
- Occupations: Typist, personal secretary
- Known for: Companion of B. R. Ambedkar
- Notable work: Reminiscences and rememberances of Dr. B.R. Ambedkar, Last Few Years of Dr Ambedkar

Nanak Chand Rattu (1922–2002) was the personal assistant of B. R. Ambedkar, India's first Minister of Law. Like Ambedkar, Rattu was born in a Dalit family that was considered untouchable in the traditional caste-based society. He came from Punjab to Delhi in search of a job, and became known to Ambedkar as a government employee. Even after Ambedkar resigned from his position, Rattu continued to serve him, and typed most of his writings, including the manuscripts of The Buddha and His Dhamma and Riddles in Hinduism. After Ambedkar's death, he wrote books on Ambedkar's life that were published in the 1990s.

== Early life ==
Nanak Chand Rattu was born on 6 February 1922 in the Sakruli village of Hoshiarpur District of Punjab. He belonged to a poor Ad-Dharmi family, considered untouchable in the traditional caste-based society. After passing the matriculation exam in 1938, he could not find a job in Punjab. In August 1939, he came to Delhi for an interview, but was not selected for the job. He did several odd jobs, including as a gatekeeper in a movie theater and the Delhi Cloth Mills. In 1940, he got a clerical job at a Government of India office.

== As Ambedkar's secretary and factotum ==
Rattu served as Amebdkar's secretary for over 17 years, from 3 January 1940 to Ambedkar's death on 6 December 1956. Ambedkar served as the Minister of Law in the First Nehru ministry, and during 1942–1951, Rattu visited Ambedkar's official residence (first 22 Prithviraj Road and then 1 Hardinge Avenue) several times.

In September 1951, Ambedkar resigned from Nehru's cabinet, following the impasse over the Hindu Code Bill. Since he no longer had any official secretarial staff, he asked Nanak Chand Rattu to be his secretary and factotum, since Rattu had earlier expressed a keen interest in helping him. Rattu, who retained his job as a typist in a central government office, readily agreed. After his resignation, Ambedkar and his wife Savita lived at 26 Alipur Road, a rented bungalow. Rattu would come to Ambedkar's residence every evening and work there until well past midnight. He typed nearly all of Ambedkar's writings between October 1951 and December 1956, when Ambedkar died. These writings included the manuscripts of the books The Buddha and His Dhamma and Riddles in Hinduism.

Like Ambedkar, Rattu eventually converted to Buddhism.

== After Ambedkar's death ==
Savita Ambedkar continued to live at 26 Alipur Road after her husband's death. Ambedkar's papers, including the ones typed by Rattu, were kept in a storeroom: Rattu would dust and fumigate them occasionally. In 1967, many of these papers were destroyed in rain, after the new owner of the house dumped them in a yard. After Savita Ambedkar officially evacuated 26 Alipur Road on 31 August 1967, as per a court order, Rattu sheltered her at his own house for a few months. Later, he helped her sell her Mehrauli house, when she decided to move to Mumbai. After she moved to Mumbai, he kept in touch with her via correspondence by mail. He visited Mumbai several times, and treated her with reverence and respect.

=== Allegations against Savita Ambedkar ===
Despite maintaining cordial relations with Savita Ambedkar, Rattu told biographers of B. R. Ambedkar that he suspected her of poisoning her husband. According to him, she slowly poisoned Ambedkar by giving him insulin overdoses, and a post-mortem would not have revealed this. The writings by these biographers encouraged misgivings against Savita Ambedkar. She was unaware of Rattu's allegations against her, until Vijay Surwade gave her photocopies of Rattu's typed and signed statements to the biographers Dhananjay Keer and C. B. Khairmode. One day, in 1994 or 1995, when Rattu visited her, she asked him about the allegations. When Rattu denied making any such allegations, she showed him the photocopies. According to her, Rattu was "completely nonplussed": she asked him to leave and never visit her again. The two did not interact again after this incident.

In his own book, published in the 1990s, Rattu implies that Savita Ambedkar ensured that her husband did not get adequate medical care in the final years of his life, leading to his death.

=== Later life ===
Rattu retired from government service in February 1980. Rattu wrote a book titled Reminiscences and rememberances of Dr. B.R. Ambedkar, published in 1995 by Falcon Books for the Babasaheb Ambedkar Memorial Committee of Great Britain. In 1997, Last Few Years of Dr Ambedkar, another of his books, was published.

Rattu donated several items to an Ambedkar-themed museum established by Wamanrao Godbole at Shantivan in Chincholi (near Nagpur). These items had been gifted to him by Savita Ambedkar, and included several things used by the Ambedkars. In 2001, there was a conflict among the museum's committee members, and Rattu learned that Godbole was being ousted from the committee. Rattu decided to demand his donations back, but for this, he needed a certificate from Savita Ambedkar stating that she had gifted these to him. Since he was not on talking terms with her anymore, he drafted the certificate, and requested Vijay Surwade to get her signature on the document. However, Vijay Surwade did not get the document signed because Savita Ambedkar was in an "unbalanced state of mind" at the time. Rattu died shortly after, on 15 September 2002, and Savita Ambedkar died in 2003.
