= S. V. Raju =

Indian politician (1933–2015)

Singanallur Venkatraman Raju (1933 – 19 May 2015) was an Indian politician, best known for his association with the Swatantra Party on post of executive secretary of the party and his editorship of Freedom First magazine.

== Early life ==
Raju was born in Singanallur; Venkatraman was his father's name, and Raju his first name. Raju was hired by C. Rajagopalachari, the former Governor General of India and retired Chief Minister of Madras, on 16 December 1959 as the Office Secretary of Swatantra Party, which was launched four months earlier. It took Raju one year to shed his socialism and become a member of the party—of which he remained a member till the end of his life.

== Career ==
When Swatantra Party faded away in 1974, Raju, along with Geeta Doctor, took up full-time editorship of Freedom First in 1978. The Freedom First magazine had been started in 1953 by the Indian Committee for Cultural Freedom, which was established by Minoo Masani in Mumbai. Raju raised funds for its continuation in print, and funds for digitization of the magazine since its inception.

In 1996 the Maharashtra unit of the Swatantra Party, led by Raju and its general secretary, L. R. Sampat, decided to revive the Swatantra Party. To register it again and reclaim the party symbol, the star, they approached the Election Commission of India. But Indian law demands that all parties swear allegiance to socialism, in accordance with a 1989 amendment of India’s Representation of People’s Act. They refused and, instead, filed a writ petition in the Bombay High Court challenging this provision. When both Sampat and Raju had died, the High Court had still not held its first hearing on their petition.

In the late 1990s, he took upon himself the task of reviving the Indian Liberal Group, a platform for liberal values that Minoo Masani had started in 1965.

== Publications ==
- S.V. Raju (2007). Minoo Masani. National Book Trust, India. ISBN 978-81-237-5079-8.

== See also ==
- Liberalism in India
