= Muggowal =

- village
- Location in Punjab, India Muggowal (India)
- Coordinates: 31°20′44.53″N 76°4′10″E
- Country: India
- State: Punjab
- District: Hoshiarpur

Government
  - Sarpanch (Village Chief): Sukhvinder singh

Area
  - Total: 0.88 km^{2} (0.34 sq mi)

Population (2001)
  - Total: 3,500
  - Density: 4,000/km^{2} (10,000/sq mi)

Languages
  - Official: Punjabi
- Time zone: UTC+5:30 (IST)
- PIN: 146109

Muggowal or Mugowal (pronounced /muhgWoll/) is an agricultural village in the Hoshiarpur District of Punjab in India. It is the birthplace of the founder of Ad-Dharm movement and Bahujan activist Babu Mangu Ram.

== History ==
During the 16th century, in the reign of Mughal emperor Akbar, settlers arrived in the surrounding area from the village Jandu Singha (District of Jalandhar) including a Saint (Fakir), Baba Bharo from the Kalra (Black) Sanghiyan village (Kapurthala District) and was a Vizier in Akbar's army. Baba Bharo, accompanied by his two wives, Ma Shakro and Ma Maggo populated the following villages; Muggowal, Nariala, Langeri, Sakruli and Dandewal. During that period, Muggowal was populated by two families of the village Sangheyan, Dalelpur and Kherha. Dalelpur occupied the region in the west of Muggowal, whilst Kherha housed in the Maha Sati area. During the times a misunderstanding caused both populations to stop communicating. This provided an opportunity for other villages (Halluwal, Tutomazara, Jandeala and Mahilpur) in the surrounding area to expand their territory to capture the empty land between the two populations. Before the empty land could be occupied by surrounding villages (land is a source of wealth), a gentle villager by the name of Nodha, joined both populations together to break down the divide. Thus it had created a new village by name of Muggowal, which is derived from "Ma Maggo", the wife of Baba Bharo. Nodha was survived by two sons Aala and Khazana.

=== Story of Maha Sati Dadi Rani ===
Baba Bharo Ji came from Kala (Black) Sangheyan (District Kapurthala) and stayed in Sakruli, a neighbouring village of Muggowal. Baba Bharo Ji's first wife was from Village Dhadan Kalan and who had given birth to a son and daughters. Baba Bharo would later remarry, which his second wife produced a son. Legend states that the son from the second wife would marry a beautiful girl by the name Dadi Rani. This caused stepsisters from the first wife to become very jealous as they wanted Dadi Rani to marry their own biological brother instead. The evil stepsisters conjured up a plan to make Dadi Rani to remarry their own brother by killing their step brother. During the first day after the marriage, the sisters gave poisoned milk to their stepbrother causing him to die. Dadi Rani refused to remarry their biological brother, but instead chose to perform the Sati ritual, being burnt alive with her deceased husband. Before she died she placed a curse on the people related to the Sangha surname. In modern times, there is a shrine dedicated to Maha Sati Dadi Rani in the village of Muggowal, where local superstition informs people to provide a meal for Brahmin people and to perform a ritual in front of her shrine by throwing the earth from the ground in different directions.

== Demographics ==
The village has the population of 2186 according to the census of 2011. 51% are male and 49% are female. The caste breakup of village includes; 41.9% Scheduled Castes (Ad-Dharmi and Balmiki); 31% Jat Sikh, 11% Brahmin, 9% Kumhar, 5% Tarkhan and 1% other. The main occupation of village people is farming. The village has also produced five freedom fighters for India, from them Gadri Baba Babu Mangu Ram Mugowalia, Comrade Amar Singh 'Niddar', Dr. Parkash Singh and Nambardar Jagat Singh were surviving members.

== Climate ==
The winter season lasts from mid-November to mid-March. During this period, the average maximum temperature remains from 14 degrees Celsius to 22, with the average minimum temperature spread between 1 and 5 degrees. Temperature can drop to -2 degree during mid winters. The village has a long summer season which lasts for 5 months, the average maximum temperature in this season remains between 33 and 39 degree, with the average minimum temperature remaining between 22 and 28 degrees. Temperatures can reach over 40 degrees during peak time in summer. The village is located at the bank of cho. For the last fifteen years the average rainfall is slightly decreasing, however the village does welcome the below 50 inches of yearly rainfall.

== Notable people ==
- Manisha Kalyan, a female India national under-17 football team player
