= 2019–20 Indian Women's League final round =

Women's football league in India

- Dates: 24 January–14 February 2020
- Country: India
- Teams: 12
- Champions: Gokulam Kerala (1st title)
- Matches: 33
- Best Player: Ratanbala Devi
- Top goalscorer: Sabitra Bhandari (16 goals)
- Best goalkeeper: Linthoingambi Devi (5 cleansheets)
- Highest scoring: Kenkre 1–10 Gokulam Kerala (28 January 2020)
- Longest winning run: Kryphsa; Gokulam Kerala (5 matches, only league matches)
- Longest unbeaten run: Kryphsa; Gokulam Kerala (5 matches, only league matches)
- Longest winless run: BBK Dav; Bidesh XI (5 matches)
- Longest losing run: Bidesh XI (5 matches)

The 2019–20 Indian Women's League final round will be played between twelve teams divided into two groups to decide the champion of Indian Women's League fourth season. It will be played from 24 January to 14 February at the Bangalore Football Stadium in Bengaluru.

== Teams ==
Team	State/UT	Entry
Bangalore United	Bengaluru, Karnataka	2019–20 Karnataka Women's League runners–up
Baroda Football Academy	Vadodara, Gujrat	2019–20 Gujarat Women's League champions
BBK Dav	Amritsar, Punjab	2019–20 Punjab Women's League champions
Bidesh XI	Assonora, Goa	2019–20 GFA Vedanta Women's League champions
Odisha Police	Bhubaneswar, Odisha	2019–20 FAO Women's League runners–up
Kolhapur City	Kolhapur, Maharashtra	2019–20 WIFA Women's championship runners–up
Kickstart	Bengaluru, Karnataka	2019–20 Karnataka Women's League champions
Kenkre	Mumbai, Maharashtra	2019–20 WIFA Women's League champions
KRYPHSA	Imphal, Manipur	2019–20 AMFA Senior Women's Football League (BM Singh Trophy) champions
Sethu	Madurai, Tamil Nadu	Current champions
Sreebhumi	Kolkata, West Bengal	2019–20 Calcutta Women's Football League runners–up
Gokulam Kerala	Kozhikode, Kerala	Rest of India zone winners

== Group stage ==
=== Group A ===
==== Table ====
Pos	Team	Pld	W	D	L	GF	GA	GD	Pts	Qualification
1	KRYPHSA	5	5	0	0	15	0	+15	15	Semi Final
2	Sethu	5	4	0	1	23	2	+21	12	Semi Final
3	Kickstart	5	3	0	2	6	7	−1	9	
4	Kolhapur City	5	1	1	3	3	8	−5	4	
5	Baroda Football Academy	5	1	0	4	3	13	−10	3	
6	BBK Dav	5	0	1	4	1	21	−20	1	

Source: AIFF
Rules for classification: 1) points; 2) head-to-head points; 3) head-to-head goal difference; 4) goal difference; 5) number of goals scored; 6) drawing of lots

==== Matches ====
24 January 2020	KRYPHSA	4–0	Kickstart	Bengaluru
12:00 IST	Dangmei 14', 35'; Anju 19'; Ratanbala 63'	Report		Stadium: Bangalore Football Stadium; Attendance: 100; Referee: Ruba Devi Guruswamy (AIFF); MVP: Ratanbala Devi (KRYPHSA)

24 January 2020	Kolhapur City	0–5	Sethu	Bengaluru
15:00 IST		Report	Amsavalli 18'; Sandhiya 61', 66', 90+2'; Sumithra 64'	Stadium: Bangalore Football Stadium; Attendance: 200; Referee: Ranjita Devi Tekcham (AIFF); MVP: Sandhiya Ranganathan (Sethu)

25 January 2020	BBK Dav	0–3	Baroda Football Academy	Bengaluru
15:00 IST		Report	Mahima Bishnoi 47' (o.g.); Sushmita Lepcha 63'; Akanksha Kandalkar 78'	Stadium: Bangalore Football Stadium; Attendance: 212; Referee: Monika Jana (AIFF); MVP: Akanksha Kandalkar (Baroda)

27 January 2020	BBK Dav	1–1	Kolhapur City	Bengaluru
12:00 IST	Madhu Bala 84'	Report	Lhingneilam Kipgen 74'	Stadium: Bangalore Football Stadium; Attendance: 50; Referee: Phurki Lhamu Bhutia (SFA); MVP: Madhu Bala (BBK Dav)

27 January 2020	Kickstart	1–0	Baroda Football Academy	Bengaluru
15:00 IST	Mona 68'	Report		Stadium: Bangalore Football Stadium; Attendance: 100; Referee: Ranjita Devi Tekcham (AIFF); MVP: Mona (Kickstart)

28 January 2020	KRYPHSA	2–0	Sethu	Bengaluru
15:00 IST	Ratanbala 45+2', 60'	Report		Stadium: Bangalore Football Stadium; Attendance: 100; Referee: Kanika Barman (AIFF); MVP: Linthoingambi Devi (KRYPHSA)

30 January 2020	Sethu	9–0	BBK Dav	Bengaluru
12:00 IST	Sandhiya 14', 45+1', 81', 88'; Sumithra 18', 59'; Karthika A 51', 82'; Kunti Kumari Lakra 84'	Report		Stadium: Bangalore Football Stadium; Attendance: 30; Referee: Kusum Mandi (AIFF); MVP: Sandhiya Ranganathan (Sethu)

30 January 2020	Kickstart	1–0	Kolhapur City	Bengaluru
15:00 IST	Kavya P 68'	Report		Stadium: Bangalore Football Stadium; Attendance: 100; Referee: Usha Bhainsora (AIFF); MVP: Kavya P (Kickstart)

31 January 2020	Baroda Football Academy	0–4	KRYPHSA	Bengaluru
12:00 IST		Report	Roja Devi 57'; Anju 76'; Ratanbala 79'; Ranjana 90+2'	Stadium: Bangalore Football Stadium; Attendance: 100; Referee: Ruba Devi Guruswamy (AIFF); MVP: Roja Devi (KRYPHSA)

2 February 2020	Sethu	3–0	Kickstart	Bengaluru
12:00 IST	Sandhiya 12', 90'; Sumithra 39'	Report		Stadium: Bangalore Football Stadium; Attendance: 150; Referee: Ranjita Devi Tekcham (AIFF); MVP: Sandhiya Ranganathan (Sethu)

2 February 2020	BBK Dav	0–4	KRYPHSA	Bengaluru
15:00 IST		Report	Anju 18'; Ratanbala 61', 85'; Sweety Devi 90+5'	Stadium: Bangalore Football Stadium; Attendance: 221; Referee: Kusum Mandi (AIFF); MVP: Ratanbala Devi (KRYPHSA)

3 February 2020	Kolhapur City	2–0	Baroda Football Academy	Bengaluru
12:00 IST	Lhingneilam Kipgen 24'; Subhadra Sahu 69'	Report		Stadium: Bangalore Football Stadium; Attendance: 100; Referee: Ruba Devi Guruswamy (AIFF); MVP: Subhadra Sahu (FC Kolhapur City)

5 February 2020	Kickstart	4–0	BBK Dav	Bengaluru
12:00 IST	Mona 40'; Kavya P 41', 90'; Renu 83'	Report		Stadium: Bangalore Football Stadium; Attendance: 50; Referee: Kusum Mandi (AIFF); MVP: Kavya P (Kickstart)

5 February 2020	KRYPHSA	1–0	Kolhapur City	Bengaluru
15:00 IST	Ratanbala 19'	Report		Stadium: Bangalore Football Stadium; Attendance: 100; Referee: Monika Jana (AIFF); MVP: Shreya Hooda (FC Kolhapur City)

6 February 2020	Baroda Football Academy	0–6	Sethu	Bengaluru
12:00 IST		Report	Sandhiya 9', 15', 75', 82'; Amsavalli 34'; Karthika A 78'	Stadium: Bangalore Football Stadium; Referee: Ranjita Devi Tekcham (AIFF); MVP: Sandhiya Ranganathan (Sethu)

=== Group B ===
==== Table ====
Pos	Team	Pld	W	D	L	GF	GA	GD	Pts	Qualification
1	Gokulam Kerala	5	5	0	0	28	2	+26	15	Semi Final
2	Kenkre	5	4	0	1	13	14	−1	12	Semi Final
3	Odisha Police	5	2	1	2	9	12	−3	7	
4	Sreebhumi	5	1	2	2	4	5	−1	5	
5	Bangalore United	5	1	1	3	4	9	−5	4	
6	Bidesh XI	5	0	0	5	2	18	−16	0	

Source: AIFF
Rules for classification: 1) points; 2) head-to-head points; 3) head-to-head goal difference; 4) goal difference; 5) number of goals scored; 6) drawing of lots

==== Matches ====
25 January 2020	Kenkre	4–1	Odisha Police	Bengaluru
12:00 IST	Soumya Guguloth 25', 39', 69'; Samiksha 45+1'	Report	Jabamani Soren 87'	Stadium: Bangalore Football Stadium; Attendance: 212; Referee: Kanika Barman (AIFF); MVP: Soumya Guguloth (Kenkre)

26 January 2020	Bidesh XI	1–2	Bangalore United	Bengaluru
12:00 IST	Sushmita Jadhav 86'	Report	Satyabati Khadia 22', 59'	Stadium: Bangalore Football Stadium; Attendance: 283; Referee: Kusum Mandi (AIFF); MVP: Satyabati Khadia (Bangalore United)

26 January 2020	Gokulam Kerala	1–0	Sreebhumi	Bengaluru
15:00 IST	Sabitra 67'	Report		Stadium: Bangalore Football Stadium; Attendance: 250; Referee: Usha Bhainsora (AIFF)

28 January 2020	Kenkre	1–10	Gokulam Kerala	Bengaluru
12:00 IST	Soumya Guguloth 35'	Report	Karishma Shirvoikar 3', 17', 51'; Sabitra 7', 19', 45+2', 48', 61'; Manisha 20', 30'	Stadium: Bangalore Football Stadium; Attendance: 200; Referee: Ruba Devi Guruswamy (AIFF); MVP: Soumya Guguloth (Kenkre)

29 January 2020	Bidesh XI	0−2	Sreebhumi	Bengaluru
12:00 IST		Report	Poonam 25'; Ritu Devi 62'	Stadium: Bangalore Football Stadium; Referee: Phukri Lhamu Bhutia (SFA); MVP: Poonam (Sreebhumi)

29 January 2020	Odisha Police	1−0	Bangalore United	Bengaluru
15:00 IST	Jasmani Samad 50'	Report		Stadium: Bangalore Football Stadium; Referee: Monika Jana (AIFF); MVP: Jasmani Samad (Odisha Police)

31 January 2020	Kenkre	3–1	Bidesh XI	Bengaluru
15:00 IST	Soumya Guguloth 18'; Jyoti 54'; Puja Karmakar 89'	Report	Stessi Cardozo 90+4'	Stadium: Bangalore Football Stadium; Attendance: 100; Referee: Kanika Barman (AIFF); MVP: Soumya Guguloth (Kenkre)

1 February 2020	Gokulam Kerala	7–0	Odisha Police	Bengaluru
12:00 IST	Sabitra 5', 52', 53', 74', 83'; Agbo 90'; Grace Lalrampari 90+3'	Report		Stadium: Bangalore Football Stadium; Attendance: 40; Referee: Monika Jana (AIFF); MVP: Sabitra Bhandari (Gokulam Kerala FC)

1 February 2020	Bangalore United	0–0	Sreebhumi	Bengaluru
15:00 IST		Report		Stadium: Bangalore Football Stadium; Attendance: 100; Referee: Phurki Lamu Bhutia (SFA); MVP: Rumpa Malik (Sreebhumi FC)

3 February 2020	Sreebhumi	1–3	Kenkre	Bengaluru
15:00 IST	Aarti 33'	Report	Soumya Guguloth 5', 18'; Asha Kumari 47'	Stadium: Bangalore Football Stadium; Attendance: 100; Referee: Usha Bhainsora (AIFF); MVP: Soumya Guguloth (Kenkre)

4 February 2020	Bangalore United	1−5	Gokulam Kerala	Bengaluru
12:00 IST	Satyabati Khadia 5'	Report	Komal Kumari 3' (o.g.); Bhandari 46'; K.Devi 51', 58', 90+3'	Stadium: Bangalore Football Stadium; Referee: Kanika Barman (AIFF); MVP: Kamala Devi (Gokulam Kerala)

4 February 2020	Odisha Police	6−0	Bidesh XI	Bengaluru
15:00 IST	Arati Anima Khadi 24'; Tikina Samal 34', 85'; Jabamani Soren 42', 54', 67'	Report		Stadium: Bangalore Football Stadium; Referee: Phurki Lamu Bhutia (SFA); MVP: Jabamani Soren (Odisha Police)

6 February 2020	Kenkre	2−1	Bangalore United	Bengaluru
15:00 IST	Asha Kumari 46'; Techi Akung 56'	Report	Amoolya Kamal 86'	Stadium: Bangalore Football Stadium; Referee: Usha Bhainsora (AIFF); MVP: Techi Akung (Kenkre)

7 February 2020	Odisha Police	1−1	Sreebhumi	Bengaluru
12:00 IST	Tikina Samal 26'	Report	Poonam 79'	Stadium: Bangalore Football Stadium; Attendance: 75; Referee: Phurki Lhamu Bhutia (SFA); MVP: Poonam (Sreebhumi FC)

7 February 2020	Bidesh XI	0−5	Gokulam Kerala	Bengaluru
15:00 IST		Report	K.Devi 4'; Scindia Saundatikar 57' (o.g.); Bhandari 63'; Thokchom Umapati Devi 82'; Karishma Shirvoikar 86'	Stadium: Bangalore Football Stadium; Attendance: 100; Referee: Kanika Barman (AIFF); MVP: Thokchom Umapati Devi (Gokulam Kerala)

== Knock–out stage ==
Top two teams from each group will make it to the semifinals, will be played on February 10 and the final will be held on February 14.

=== Bracket ===
Semi-finals
1	KRYPHSA	3
4	Kenkre	1
3	Gokulam Kerala	3
2	Sethu	0

Final
KRYPHSA	2
Gokulam Kerala	3

=== Semi-finals ===
10 February 2020
12:00 IST

KRYPHSA	3–1	Kenkre
Ratanbala Devi 18', 38'; Roja Devi 62'	Report	Jyoti 43'

Bangalore Football Stadium, Bengaluru
Attendance: 198
Referee: Ruba Devi Guruswamy (AIFF)

10 February 2020
15:00 IST

Gokulam Kerala	3–0	Sethu
Manisha Kalyan 21'; Sabitra Bhandari 44', 83'	Report

Bangalore Football Stadium, Bengaluru
Attendance: 600
Referee: Ranjita Devi Tekcham (AIFF)

=== Final ===
14 February 2020
15:00 IST

KRYPHSA	2–3	Gokulam Kerala
Grace Dangmei 33'; Ratanbala Devi 72'	Report	Prameshwori Devi 1'; Kamala Devi 25'; Sabitra Bhandari 87'

Bangalore Football Stadium, Bengaluru
Referee: Kanika Barman (AIFF)

== Statistics ==
=== Top scorers ===
As of 14 February 2020

Rank	Player	Club	Goals
1	(Nepal) Sabitra Bhandari	Gokulam Kerala	16
2	(India) Sandhiya Ranganathan	Sethu	13
3	(India) Ratanbala Devi	KRYPHSA	10
4	(India) Soumya Guguloth	Kenkre	7
5	(India) Yumnam Kamala Devi	Gokulam Kerala	5
6	(India) Sumithra Kamaraj	Sethu	4
6	(India) Jabamani Soren	Odisha Police	4
6	(India) Karishma Shirvoikar	Gokulam Kerala	4
9	(India) Anju Tamang	KRYPHSA	3
9	(India) Satyabati Khadia	Bangalore United	3
9	(India) Kavya P	Kickstart	3
9	(India) Karthika A	Sethu	3
9	(India) Tikina Samal	Odisha Police	3
9	(India) Manisha Kalyan	Gokulam Kerala	3
9	(India) Dangmei Grace	KRYPHSA	3

=== Hat-tricks ===
Result column shows goal tally of player's team first.

No.	Player	For	Against	Goals	Result	Date	Ref.
1	(India) Sandhiya Ranganathan	Sethu	Kohlapur	3	5−0	24 January 2020	
2	(India) Soumya Guguloth	Kenkre	Odisha Police	3	4−1	25 January 2020	
3	(India) Karishma Shirvoikar	Gokulam Kerala	Kenkre	3	10−1	28 January 2020	
4	(Nepal) Sabitra Bhandari	Gokulam Kerala	Kenkre	5	10−1	28 January 2020	
5	(India) Sandhiya Ranganathan	Sethu	BBK Dav	4	9−0	30 January 2020	
6	(Nepal) Sabitra Bhandari	Gokulam Kerala	Odisha Police	5	7−0	1 February 2020	
7	(India) Yumnam Kamala Devi	Gokulam Kerala	Bangalore United	3	5−1	4 February 2020	
8	(India) Jabamani Soren	Odisha Police	Bidesh XI	3	6−0	4 February 2020	
9	(India) Sandhiya Ranganathan	Sethu	Baroda	4	6−0	6 February 2020	

== Season awards ==
Hero Indian Women's League 2019–20 awards.

Award	Recipient
Top Scorer	Sabitra Bhandari (Gokulam Kerala)
Best Goalkeeper	Maibam Linthoingambi Devi (KRYPHSA)
Most Valuable Player	Nongmaithem Ratanbala Devi (KRYPHSA)
Emerging Player	Manisha Kalyan (Gokulam Kerala)
