= Muzamil Mahmood =

Indian football manager (born 1982)

- Muzamil during AFC coaching in 2023

Personal information
- Full name: Muzamil Mahmood Dar
- Date of birth: 14 November 1982 (age 43)
- Place of birth: Ganderbal, Jammu and Kashmir, India
- Height: 5 ft 11 in (1.80 m)

Managerial career
- Years: Team
- 2017–18: Real Kashmir (assistant)
- 2019–20: Kolhapur City
- 2021–22: Chandigarh
- 2022–23: Ali Jana
- 2023–: Rising Pune FC

Muzamil Mahmood Dar (born 14 November 1982) is an Indian professional football manager.

== Coaching career ==
After getting a masters degree from Kashmir University, Mahmood made his way to Mumbai to attend an introductory coaching course and qualified in it. In the following three years, he qualified as an Asian Football Confederation B license coach and commemorated his complete transition into a professional football coach. He was later appointed as the head coach of Jammu and Kashmir Football Academy (U-15).

Mahmood was appointed as head coach of FC Kolhapur City in the 2019–20 Indian Women's League, which is the top-tier league of women football in India. He also served as the head coach of Chandigarh football team for Santosh Trophy (2021).

In 2017, Mahmood was appointed as an assistant coach of Real Kashmir FC in their first season of I-League 2 under head coach David Robertson. He also worked as a scout for the Reliance Foundation Young Champs, focusing on talent identification and development in the Jammu and Kashmir region.

Mahmood is the Asian Football confederation "A" Licensed football coach from Kashmir Division. He has also done a coaching course in Brazil under the Argentina football coach Juan Marcos Troia.

== Managerial statistics ==
Managerial record by team and tenure
Team	From	To	Record				
Team	From	To	P	W	D	L	Win %
Kolhapur City	2019	2020	5	1	1	3	20.0
Chandigarh	2021	2022	4	1	1	2	25.0
Total			9	2	2	5	22.2
