= Meera Sanyal =

Indian banker and politician (1961–2019)

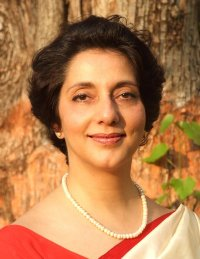
- Born: Meera Hiranandani; 15 October 1961; Cochin, Kerala, India
- Died: 11 January 2019 (aged 57); Mumbai, Maharashtra, India
- Education: Cathedral and John Connon School; University of Mumbai; INSEAD
- Title: CEO and Chair of the Royal Bank of Scotland (India)
- Term: 1983-2013
- Political party: Aam Aadmi Party
- Spouse: Ashish J Sanyal
- Parent(s): Gulab Mohanlal Hiranandani; Banu Hiranandani
- Website: meerasanyal.com

Meera Sanyal (née Hiranandani; 15 October 1961 – 11 January 2019) was an Indian banker and politician. She was CEO and chair of the Royal Bank of Scotland in India. The daughter of a highly decorated Naval officer, Vice Admiral Gulab Mohanlal Hiranandani, she was involved in banking for over 30 years before stepping down from RBS to stand as the Aam Aadmi Party candidate in South Mumbai in the 2014 Lok Sabha elections, which she lost. She had earlier contested as an independent candidate in the 2009 Lok Sabha elections from the Mumbai South constituency.

She was on the board of Pradan, an Indian NGO that works to empower women through entrepreneurship and on the international board of Right to Play. She was also on the boards of Jai Hind College and the Indian Liberal Group. She was a member of various national committees at the CII and FICCI. She was the former chairperson of the Indian Advisory Board of AIESEC, the world's largest student organisation. On 11 January 2019, Sanyal died of cancer.

== Early life ==
Sanyal was born in 1961 to Indian Navy officer, Gulab Mohanlal Hiranandani, and his wife, Banu Hiranandani; a Sindhi family who migrated from Sindh to India at the time of the Partition of India. Her father was the mastermind of Operation Trident, the crippling Naval attack on Karachi, Pakistan during the Indo-Pakistani War of 1971.

Sanyal graduated in commerce (B.Com.) from Sydenham college Bombay in 1982 with an MBA from INSEAD, Fontainebleau, France, in 1983. She attended the six-week Advanced Management Program at Harvard Business School in 2006. She was a fellow of the Chartered Institute of Bankers (UK).

== Professional and public life ==
After a 30-year banking career, Sanyal stepped down from her position as CEO and chairperson of Royal Bank of Scotland India, in 2013, to focus on public service. During her time at the bank, she mentored the MicroFinance program, which financed over 650,000 women in rural India. She also chaired the bank's Foundation, providing livelihood assistance to 75,000 women-led households in threatened ecosystems. Her banking career was distinguished both in India and overseas. She was the head of Corporate Finance and later the COO for ABN AMRO in Asia. She also started and led the global BPO and ITes for ABN AMRO / RBS in India.

Sanyal was a board member of Pradan, a member of the International Board of Right To Play, a global NGO. She was also a board member of LiberalsIndia for Good Governance – the Indian Liberal Group, and was on the supervisory board of Jaihind College. She was a member of various National Committees of both FICCI and CII. In 2011, Secretary of State Hillary Clinton, invited her as the sole Indian representative on her International Council on Women's Business Leadership.

She was invited to speak at global seminars including:

- Climate Summit in Copenhagen
- Swedish Agency for Economic & Regional Growth
- Women of the Future summit in the UK
- Asian Institute of Finance, Kuala Lumpur
- Nikkei Summit for Asian Women Leaders, Tokyo
- Global Competitiveness Summit, Seoul, Korea

== Political life ==
Sanyal stood in 2009 as an independent candidate for the Lok Sabha elections in the aftermath of the 2008 Mumbai attacks but lost the election. Along with her husband, she campaigned and raised funds for the AAP in the 2013 Delhi elections. She was a member of AAP's National Committee on Economic Policy.

In May 2014, Sanyal contested 2014 Lok Sabha election from the Mumbai South constituency, as an Aam Aadmi Party candidate. She lost, receiving 5.2% of the vote cast in South Mumbai constituency, trailing at fourth position behind Arvind Sawant (Shiv Sena candidate, winner), Milind Deora (INC candidate) and Bala Nandgaokar (MNS candidate).

== Death ==
On 11 January 2019, Sanyal died due to cancer after two years of treatment.
