= Gulab Mohanlal Hiranandani =

Vice Admiral G M Hiranandani PVSM, AVSM, NM
- Born: 29 June 1931; Karachi, Sindh, British India (Present day: Karachi, Sindh, Pakistan)
- Died: 1 September 2009 (aged 78); Malakkara, Pathanamthitta District, Kerala, India
- Military career
- Allegiance: India
- Branch: Indian Navy
- Service years: 1949–1989
- Rank: Vice admiral
- Commands: Southern Naval Command; INS Rajput (D51); INS Dronacharya; INS Tir
- Conflicts: Indo-Pakistani War of 1971
- Awards: Param Vishisht Seva Medal; Ati Vishisht Seva Medal; Nausena Medal
- Other work: Member, UPSC 1989–1995; Official Historian, Indian Navy 1995–2009; Author, Transition to Triumph; Author, Transition to Eminence; Author, Transition to Guardianship

Vice Admiral Gulab Mohanlal Hiranandani, PVSM, AVSM, NM (29 June 1931 – 1 September 2009) was a former flag officer in the Indian Navy. He served as the vice chief of the naval staff from 1987 to 1989. Prior to that, he served as the flag officer commanding-in-chief Southern Naval Command. He was the commissioning commanding officer of the INS Rajput (D51), the lead vessel of the Rajput class destroyers. He was awarded the Nausena Medal for gallantry during the Indo-Pakistan War of 1971.

Hiranandani is also credited with the detailed planning of the Indian Naval Academy at Ezhimala and INS Kadamba in Karwar, the foundation stones for which were laid during his tenure as flag officer commanding in chief Southern Naval Command. During his tenure all naval training was centralized under the Southern Naval Command. A brilliant tactician, his work remains pivotal to Indian naval training on maneuvers and operational tactics.

After retirement, Hiranandani served on the Union Public Service Commission. Later, he was appointed the official historian of the Indian Navy. He authored three landmark books on Indian naval history, Transition to Triumph, Transition to Eminence and Transition to Guardianship. These books covered the history of the Indian Navy from 1965 to 2000.

== Service career ==
Hiranandani was born in Karachi to a Sindhi Hindu family. Hiranandani joined the Royal Indian Navy in 1949. He trained with the Royal Navy, between 1949 and 1953. He underwent specialized training in gunnery and missiles in 1957. In 1965, he attended the Naval Staff College at Royal Naval College, Greenwich. He held a master's degree in military science and a doctorate in political science.

In 1961, he was appointed the commandant of INS Dronacharya, and was promoted to commander on 30 June 1969.

During the Indo-Pakistan War of 1971, Hiranandani served as the fleet operations officer of the Western Fleet. In this role, he led the detailed planning and logistics for key naval operations. He was awarded the Nau Sena Medal for his role in planning and implementing of Operation Trident and Operation Python.

Hiranandani served as the deputy director weapons policy & tactics (1968–1970) where he was instrumental in the acquisition of the missile boats used in Operation Python & Operation Trident. He developed the tactics on how to deploy them in war. During his Tenure as commanding officer, INS Tir (1970–1971), he developed and tested methods of towing the short range missile boats from Vizag in Bombay in heavy seas during the monsoon of 1971. These techniques were then used to tow the missile boats near Karachi harbour to be used as Missile delivery Vehicles with devastating effect. He was appointed the Director of Combat Policy and Tactics (DCPT), serving from 1974 to 1977. He was a deep thinker and brilliant tactician. His work on naval strategy remains the basis for much of the tactical training and operational maneuvers of the Indian Navy. He was awarded the Ati Vishisht Seva Medal (AVSM) for this contribution. Hiranandani was promoted substantive captain on 1 January 1976. In 1980, he commissioned INS Rajput (D51), the lead vessel of the Rajput class destroyers as its first commanding officer.

=== Flag rank ===
Hiranandani was appointed the chief of staff of the Western Naval Command in 1981, with promotion to rear admiral on 7 May 1981. Promoted vice admiral on 30 June 1983, he was appointed the Deputy Chief of the Naval Staff the same year. During this time he laid the foundation for the Project 15 Class of Stealth Guided Missile destroyers. He worked in close co-ordination with the DRDO & Bharat Electricals to indigenously design the electronics and Missile systems required for our new Warships. He was instrumental in putting together a long ship building plan which gave The Indian Navy the capability to be self sufficient in building its own up to date warships and missiles.

In 1985, Hiranandani was appointed the flag officer commanding-in-chief (FOC-in-C) of the Southern Naval Command. During his tenure in this office, he led the detailed planning for the development of the Indian Naval Academy at Ezhimala, Kerala. He was also involved in the planning of INS Kadamba in Karwar, Karnataka. He was instrumental in persuading the chief ministers of Kerala and Karnataka to transfer the land for these massive projects to the navy. He was awarded the Param Vishisht Seva Medal (PVSM) for these contributions.

In 1987, he was appointed the vice chief of the naval staff (VCNS). While serving as the VCNS, he was involved in Operation Cactus – 1988 Maldives coup d'état attempt. He was the officiating CNS on 3 November 1988 when the operation was launched as the CNS was out of the country. He was part of the apex level planning of the operation, in which several warships of the Indian Navy participated. Hiranandani retired from active service in the Indian Navy in 1989.

== Later contributions ==
After retirement from the Navy, Hiranandani served as a member of the Union Public Service Commission for six years between 1989 and 1995. He retired as the commission's Acting Chairman.

In 1995, he was appointed the Official Historian of the Indian Navy. He authored a trilogy on the history of the Indian Navy. Transition to Triumph covering the period between 1965 and 1975 was published in 1999. Transition to Eminence captures naval history between 1976 and 1990 was published in 2004. Transition to Guardianship covers the history of the navy between 1991 and 2000 and was completed just before his death. It was released on Navy Day, 4 December 2009.

Hiranandani also wrote a number of analytical reports on a maritime security and strategic issues. and analysis reports.

== Personal life ==
Hiranandani was married to Susheel Hiranandani. His son, Dr Manik Hiranandani, is a physician and his daughter, Meera Sanyal, was a banker and civil society activist.

Military offices
Preceded by Jayant Ganpat Nadkarni	Vice Chief of the Naval Staff; 1987–1989	Succeeded by S. C. Chopra
Preceded by K. K. Nayyar	Flag Officer Commanding-in-Chief Southern Naval Command; 1984–1987	Succeeded by Laxminarayan Ramdas
Preceded by Subimal Mookerjee	Deputy Chief of the Naval Staff; 1983–1984	Succeeded by S. Jain
