= Bhadant Anand Kausalyayan =

Indian Buddhist scholar and author (1905–1988)

- Born: Harnam Das; 5 January 1905; Sohana Village, Ambala, Punjab, British India
- Died: 22 June 1988 (aged 83); India
- Education: Bachelor of Arts in National college of Arts, Lahore, Punjab, Pakistan
- Occupations: Writer, essayist, scholar
- Writing career
- Notable works: Yadi Baba Na Hote; Kahan Kya Dekha; Hindi Translation of The Buddha and his Dhamma

Bhadant Anand Kausalyayan (5 January 1905 – 22 June 1988) was an Indian Buddhist monk, scholar, traveller and a prolific writer. He is considered one of the great activists of Buddhism of the 20th century. He was influenced by the Buddhist scholar and social reformer Rahul Sankrityayan and B. R. Ambedkar.

== Personal life ==
Bhadant Anand Kausalyayan was born Harnam Das on 5 January 1905 in Sohana Village of Ambala district in Punjab (now in Mohali district) in a Khatri family. He had a BA from the National College in Lahore. His travels took him to different parts of the world where he promoted Buddhism like his mentor, Mahapandit Rahul Sankrityayan. He always wanted to have experience of travelling far distances across many countries and discover new things. His aim was to continue the tradition started by his inspirations. He is one of the pioneers of Indian travel literature.

Bhadant Anand Kausalyayan died on 22 June 1988 at Mayo Hospital, Nagpur.

== Works ==
He contributed a lot to Indian travel literature and Hindi. He worked for Hindi Sahitya Sammelan, Prayag, Rastrabhasha Prachar Samiti, Vardha etc. He used very simple language in his books that everyone could easily understand. He wrote many essays, novels, books on his travel to different places. He also wrote many books on Buddhism. More than 25 of his books were published.

Ambedkar had lakhs of Buddhist followers, who were, after his mahaparinirvana, in need of a strong Buddhist leader, particularly in Maharashtra. Kausalyayan travelled and guided Maharashtrian Buddhists and also translated Ambedkar's work The Buddha and His Dhamma into Hindi. He also traced and collected original resources from the Tipitaka and other Buddhist literature.

He was also recognised as an India freedom fighter, he participated in Quit India Movement with his friend Bhadant Rahul Sankrityayan.

== Books ==
- Bhikshu Ke Patra
- Jo Bhul Na Saka
- Aah! Aisi Daridrata
- Bahanebazi
- Yadi Baba Na Hote
- Rail Ke Ticket
- Kahan Kya Dekha
- Sanskriti
- Desh Ki Mitti Bulati hai
- Bauddha Dharma Ek Buddiwadi Adhyayan
- Shri Lanka
- Hindi and Punjabi translation of B.R. Ambedkar's The Buddha and His Dhamma
- Manusmriti kyon Jalai Gai?
- Bhagwad Gita ki Buddhiwadi Samiksha
- Ram Kahani Ram ki Jabani
- An Intelligent Man's Guide to Buddhism
- Bodhidrum ke kuch panne
- Dharm Ke Naam par
- bhagvan buddha aur unke anuchar
- bhagvan buddha aur unke samkalin bhikshu
- Boudh dharma ka sar a hidi translation of essence of buddhism by P l Narsu
- Bhadant Anand Kaushalyan jeevan va karya – by Dr. M.L. Gautam (Life and work of Ven. Dr. Bhadant Anand Kausalyan)
- Avashyak Pali (Basic Pali) – by Ven. Dr. Bhadant Anand Kaushalyayan
- The Gospel of Buddha : Translation by Ven. Dr. Bhadant Anand Kaushalyan of the book – The Gospel of Buddha by Paul Carus
- Dhammapada Hindi translation
- Hindi translation of B.R. Ambedkar's Riddles in Hinduism
