= Mangu Ram =

Indian politician

Mangu Ram Mugowalia
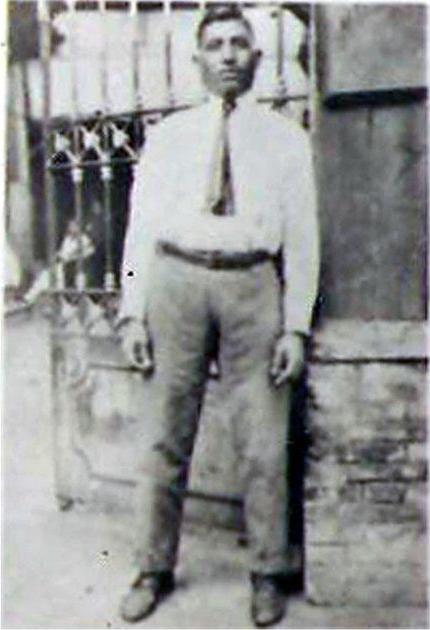
- Photograph of Mangu Ram Mugowalia in the Philippines, 1920

Member of Punjab Legislative Assembly
- In office 21 March 1946 – 4 July 1947

Personal details
- Born: 14 January 1886 Muggowal, Hoshiarpur, Punjab Province, British India (now India)
- Died: 22 April 1980 (aged 94)
- Party: Unionist Party (Punjab) (1946–1947)
- Other political affiliations: Ghadar Party (Before 1946)

Mangu Ram (14 January 1886 – 22 April 1980), known popularly as Babu Mangu Ram Chaudhry, was an Indian freedom fighter, a politician from Punjab.

In 1909, he immigrated to the United States and there became associated with the Ghadar Party. Upon his return to India in 1925, he became a leader of the low-caste people, organising them in opposition to the system of untouchability that oppressed them. He was instrumental in the foundation of the Ad-Dharmi Movement, an organisation dedicated to attaining equality for Untouchables. He was elected to the Punjab Legislative Assembly in 1946 and in 1972 received recognition in the form of a pension and an award from Indira Gandhi for his work towards Indian independence.

== Family background ==
Mangu Ram was born into a Chamar family. His father found work supplying leather for military boots for the Jalandhar cantonment.

== Education ==
Initially Mangu Ram was taught by a village saint (Sadhu) till the age of seven. He attended schools in Mugowal area and Dehradun. In most of the schools Mangu Ram was the only Dalit student. He was forced to sit in the back of the classroom, or even in a separate room, and had to listen through the open door. When he attended high school in Bajwara, he was forced to stay outside the building and had to listen to the classes through the windows. Once when he came inside during a heavy hailstorm, the Brahman teacher beat him and put all the classroom furniture, which he had "polluted" by his presence, outside in the rain to be literally and ritually washed clean. Nonetheless, Mangu Ram was a good student, he came third in his class in primary school. While the other students were encouraged to become patwaris (village record-keeper) or to seek higher education, Mangu Ram was encouraged to leave school and help his father at a more proper "Chamar task".

Mangu Ram's father, having enough funds from his occupation supplying leather material for boots for the Jalandhar cantonment, sent his son Mangu Ram to California for better prospects. However, Mangu Ram decided to return from America and started a movement against caste discrimination and untouchability.

== Ad-Dharmi movement ==
Initially, Mangu Ram tried working with the Arya Samaj but lost hope and decided to launch a separate identity apart from Hinduism and Sikhism, known as Ad-Dharma. In 1925, after returning from the US, Babu Mangoo Ram started teaching in a primary school in his home village of Mugowal, a school which he named Ad Dharm School. It was the same school where Babu Mangu Ram first convened the meeting that formally launched the Ad Dharam Movement. The establishment of movement was the voice against the brahminical society which put Dalits at bottom of the social structure. It was the glorious step by Dalits to attain the equality in caste laden society. Through the Ad dharm Movement, babu Mangu Ram pioneered Dalit Movement in North India.

He succeeded remarkably well in creating awareness and awakening among the people. His path was beset with difficulties, and he had to work against the odds and trying circumstances. The message brought by Babu Mangu Ram was new and inspiring. It was aimed at awakening the untouchables. The message called upon them to know and realize themselves as they had forgotten their true selves due to hostile influences in which they had been living for thousands of years. It caught imagination and hearts of downtrodden people, soon Babu Mangu Ram became household name. In 1931, the British colonial administration recognized the Ad-Dharmis as a separate religious community apart from Hinduism and Sikhism. However, after Indian independence in 1947, they were clubbed under the Hindu scheduled-castes.

== Death ==
Mangu Ram died on 22 April 1980.

== See also ==
- Giani Ditt Singh (Sant Ditta Ram)
