= Manisha Kalyan =

Indian footballer (born 2001)

Personal information
- Full name: Manisha Kalyan
- Date of birth: 27 November 2001 (age 24)
- Place of birth: Muggowal, Hoshiarpur, Punjab, India
- Height: 1.72 m (5 ft 8 in)
- Position: Forward

Team information
- Current team: AEK Athens

Youth career
- 2016–2017: Sethu

Senior career*
Years	Team	Apps	(Gls)
2017–2018	Sethu	3	(2)
2018–2022	Gokulam Kerala	24	(21)
2022–2024	Apollon	36	(14)
2024–2025	PAOK	17	(7)
2025–2026	Alianza Lima	11	(2)
2026–	AEK Athens	0	(0)

International career^{‡}
2018	India U17	4	(1)
2018	India U18	4	(1)
2018	India U19	3	(3)
2019–	India	53	(15)
- * Club domestic league appearances and goals as of 25 July 2026 ‡ National team caps and goals as of 27 June 2026

Manisha Kalyan (born 27 November 2001) is an Indian professional footballer who plays as a forward for the Greek A Division club AEK Athens and the India women's national team. She won the 2020–21 AIFF Women's Emerging Footballer of the Year and the 2022–23 AIFF Women's Player of the Year awards. She is the first Indian footballer to play in the UEFA Women's Champions League.

== Early life ==
Manisha was born in Muggowal, located in the district of Horshiarpur, Punjab. She studied in Sant Attar Singh Khalsa Senior Secondary School and graduated from Mehr Chand Mahajan DAV College for Women. She started playing football at the age of 13. Despite facing adversity, her family being unable to afford to buy her sports shoes, being forced to walk 15 kilometres to find a girls' team to play with, and being subjected to sexist abuse, Kalyan managed to impress coah Brahmjit Singh with her footballing abilities. Kalyan was nicknamed Dinho in her youth, a nod to Brazil legend Ronaldinho.

== Club career ==
=== Gokulam Kerala ===
In 2018, Manisha signed with the newly formed Indian Women's League club Gokulam Kerala. She played a pivotal role in Gokulam's success in the 2019–20 IWL campaign. She scored 2 goals against the Kenkre FC, where her side won 1–10, she also scored a goal in their semi-finals against Sethu FC. She scored 3 goals in the tournament and was chosen as the emerging player of the tournament.

In 2021, she became the first women player from India to score in a top-flight Asian competition, when she scored in the 2021 AFC Women's Club Championship match against FC Bunyodkor, the Women's Team of Uzbekistan on 14 November, which they won 3–1 at full-time.

=== Apollon Ladies ===
On 3 July 2022, it was officially announced that Kalyan signed a contract with Limassol based Cypriot First Division club Apollon Ladies. She made her debut for the club on 18 August, coming on as a 60th-minute substitute in a 3–0 win against Rīgas FS at the UEFA Women's Champions League qualifying round.

On 2 October 2022, she scored her first goal for the club against Aris Limassol in a Cypriot First Division match. When Apollon Limassol won the 2022–23 Cypriot Women's League, she became the first Indian woman to win a European Championship. She was included in the 2022–23 Pancyprian Footballers Association (PASP) women's team of the season.

=== PAOK ===
On 15 July 2024, it was officially announced that Kalyan signed a contract with Thessaloniki-based Greek A Division club PAOK. She made 23 appearances and scored 8 goals and also provided 5 assists as PAOK finished 5th in the league and reached the semifinals of the Greek Cup.

== International career ==
Manisha was selected for the India Under-17 National Squad to play the 2018 BRICS U-17 Football Cup which was held in South Africa. She scored a goal against China Under-17, however, her side ended up losing 2–1. Manisha was then promoted to the India Under-19 National Team. She received public attention when she delivered a memorable performance in India's inspiring win over Thailand in the AFC U-19 Women's Championship Qualifiers. She scored a hat-trick in the same tournament against Pakistan which resulted in the victory of the India side with a big margin of 18–0. Manisha got her senior team call-up for the match against Hong Kong in January 2019 at the age of 17.

Kalyan made her national team debut against Indonesia in January 2019, while she maiden goal against Bangladesh in the 2019 SAFF Women's Championship. She scored her third goal against UAE on 2 October 2021 as India won the match with a score of 4–1.

With India, Kalyan went to Brazil for the 2021 International Women's Football Tournament of Manaus. On 26 November 2021, she created history after scoring a goal against Brazil in their 6–1 defeat at the 2021 International Women's Football Tournament of Manaus. In February 2024, she appeared with India at the 2024 Turkish Women's Cup, in which they ended the campaign as runners-up.

During India's final 2026 AFC Asian Cup group stage fixture against Chinese Taipei, Kalyan scored a "thundering" free-kick from 30 yards, with the ball crossing the line after bouncing off the underside of the crossbar. Despite her goal, India lost 1-3 and was eliminated from the tournament.

== Style of play ==
Manisha is an attacking midfielder and is known for her both creativity and her physicality. She is a versatile player who can attack and operate in the wings and even performs as a number 9. Primarily she plays as a left winger and sometimes as a left back.

== Personal life ==
She is the younger daughter of Narinder Pal, a businessman and Rajkumari Pal, a homemaker.

In an interview with Goal, Manisha revealed that she is a supporter of Portuguese player Cristiano Ronaldo.

== Career statistics ==
=== Club ===
As of 25 July 2026

Appearances and goals by club, season and competition
Club	Season	League			National Cup		Continental		Other		Total	
Club	Season	Division	Apps	Goals	Apps	Goals	Apps	Goals	Apps	Goals	Apps	Goals
Sethu	2017–18	Indian Women's League	3	2	0	0	—		—		3	2
Gokulam Kerala	2018–19	Indian Women's League	6	4 (Note: Player of the match award against Panjim Footballers)	0	0	—		—		6	4
Gokulam Kerala	2019–20	Indian Women's League	7	3 (Note: AIFF Women's Emerging Footballer of the Year Manisha Kalyan)	0	0	—		—		7	3
Gokulam Kerala	2020–21	Indian Women's League	0	0 (Note: IWL season got cancelled due to the 2nd wave of COVID-19 pandemic in India)	0	0	3 (Note: Appearance(s) in AFC Women's Club Championship)	1	—		3	1
Gokulam Kerala	2021–22	Indian Women's League	11	14 (Note: Manisha has 7 no. assists this season IWL 2021–22, two of the assists were against Odisha Police and another two assists against Kickstart)	0	0	—		—		11	14
Gokulam Kerala	Total		24	21	0	0	3	1	0	0	27	22
Apollon Ladies	2022–23	Cypriot First Division	17	6	1	0	2 (Note: Appearance(s) in UEFA Women's Champions League)	0	—		20	6
Apollon Ladies	2023–24	Cypriot First Division	19	8	2	0	4	1	1 (Note: Appearance(s) in Cypriot Women's Super Cup)	1	26	10
Apollon Ladies	Total		36	14	3	0	6	1	1	1	46	16
PAOK	2024–25	Greek A Division	17	7	4	1	2	0	—		23	8
Alianza Lima	2026	Liga Femenina	11	2	0	0	0	0	—		11	2
AEK	2026–27	Greek A Division							—			
Career total			91	46	7	1	11	2	1	1	110	50

=== International ===
As of 6 June 2026

National team	Year	Caps	Goals
India	2019	14	2
India	2021	12	4
India	2022	2	1
India	2023	7	0
India	2024	6	3
India	2025	7	4
India	2026	5	1
Total		53	15

Scores and results list India's goal tally first.

List of international goals scored by Manisha Kalyan
No.	Date	Venue	Opponent	Score	Result	Competition	Ref
1.	20 March 2019	Sahid Rangsala, Biratnagar, Nepal	Bangladesh	4–0	4–0	2019 SAFF Women's Championship	
2.	3 December 2019	Pokhara Rangasala, Pokhara, Nepal	Maldives	4–0	5–0	2019 South Asian Games	
3.	23 February 2021	Gold City Sports Complex, Kargıcak, Turkey	Ukraine	2–0	2–3	2021 Turkish Women's Cup	
4.	2 October 2021	Theyab Awana Stadium, Dubai, United Arab Emirates	United Arab Emirates	1–0	4–1	Friendly	
5.	10 October 2021	Hamad Town Stadium, Hamad Town, Bahrain	Bahrain	5–0	5–0	Friendly	
6.	25 November 2021	Arena da Amazônia, Manaus, Brazil	Brazil	1–1	1–6	Int. Football Tournament of Manaus	
7.	8 April 2022	Prince Mohammed Stadium, Zarqa, Jordan	Jordan	1–0	1–0	Friendly	
8.	21 February 2024	Gold City Sports Complex, Alanya, Turkey	Estonia	1–0	4–3	2024 Turkish Women's Cup	
9.	21 February 2024	Gold City Sports Complex, Alanya, Turkey	Estonia	4–1	4–3	2024 Turkish Women's Cup	
10.	17 October 2024	Dasharath Rangasala, Kathmandu, Nepal	Pakistan	2–0	5–2	2024 SAFF Women's Championship	
11.	20 February 2025	Al Hamriya Sports Club Stadium, Al Hamriyah, United Arab Emirates	Jordan	2–0	2–0	2025 Pink Ladies Cup	
12.	29 June 2025	700th Anniversary Stadium, Chiang Mai, Thailand	Timor-Leste	1–0	4–0	2026 AFC Women's Asian Cup qualification	
13.	29 June 2025	700th Anniversary Stadium, Chiang Mai, Thailand	Timor-Leste	3–0	4–0	2026 AFC Women's Asian Cup qualification	
14.	2 July 2025	700th Anniversary Stadium, Chiang Mai, Thailand	Iraq	2–0	5–0	2026 AFC Women's Asian Cup qualification	
15.	10 March 2026	Western Sydney Stadium, Sydney, Australia	Chinese Taipei	1–1	1–3	2026 AFC Women's Asian Cup	

== Honours ==
India

- SAFF Women's Championship: 2019, 2026
- South Asian Games Gold medal: 2019

Gokulam Kerala

- Indian Women's League: 2019–20, 2021–22

Apollon

- Cypriot First Division: 2022–23, 2023–24
- Cypriot Women's Cup: 2022–23
- Cypriot Women's Super Cup: 2023

Individual

- Indian Women's League Hero of the League: 2021–22
- Indian Women's League Emerging Player: 2019–20
- AIFF Women's Player of the Year: 2021–22, 2022–23
- AIFF Women's Emerging Footballer of the Year: 2020–21
- PASP Best 11 Women Awards: 2022–23
- The Times of India TOISA Footballer of the Year: 2021
- Turkish Women's Cup Best Midfielder: 2024

== See also ==
- List of Indian football players in foreign leagues
- List of Indian Women's League hat-tricks
