= Freedom First =

Monthly English language magazine in India

Freedom First is a classical liberal English-language monthly magazine in English established by Minoo Masani in Mumbai and published by the Indian Committee for Cultural Freedom. The magazine was first published in June 1952. It was edited by S. V. Raju. It stands for minimum government and maximum freedom, tempered by a sense of individual responsibility, in which the people's genius has a fair opportunity to develop and grow. In July 2015 the print version was ended and the magazine went on online.
