= FC Kolhapur City =

Indian women's football club based in Maharashtra

Kolhapur City
- Full name: Football Club Kolhapur City
- Founded: 2018; 8 years ago
- Ground: Rajarshi Shahu Stadium
- Capacity: 24,000
- League: WIFA Women's Football League

Football Club Kolhapur City is an Indian professional football club based in Kolhapur, Maharashtra, that competes in both the Indian Women's League and WIFA Women's Football League, the top tier national and regional leagues respectively, of women's football in India. They registered their first win in IWL 2019–20 against Baroda FA under head coach Muzamil Mahmood.

== History ==
The club was launched in October 2018, with the aim of playing in U13, U15, and U18 national leagues.

In 2019–20 season, after winning qualifiers for Maharashtra zone, the club participated in Indian Women's League.

== Crest ==
In the crest of FC Kolhapur City, a gaur is present, which represents strength and courage.

== Stadium ==
FC Kolhapur City plays their home matches in Chhatrapati Shahu Stadium in Kolhapur, Maharashtra.

== Journey in IWL ==
Kolhapur City got their first win after defeating Baroda FA and finished 4th in group A with 4 points.

== Honours ==
- WIFA Women's Football League
  - Champions (1): 2018–19
  - Runners-up (1): 2019–20
