= Dr. Ambedkar National Memorial =

National Memorial in India

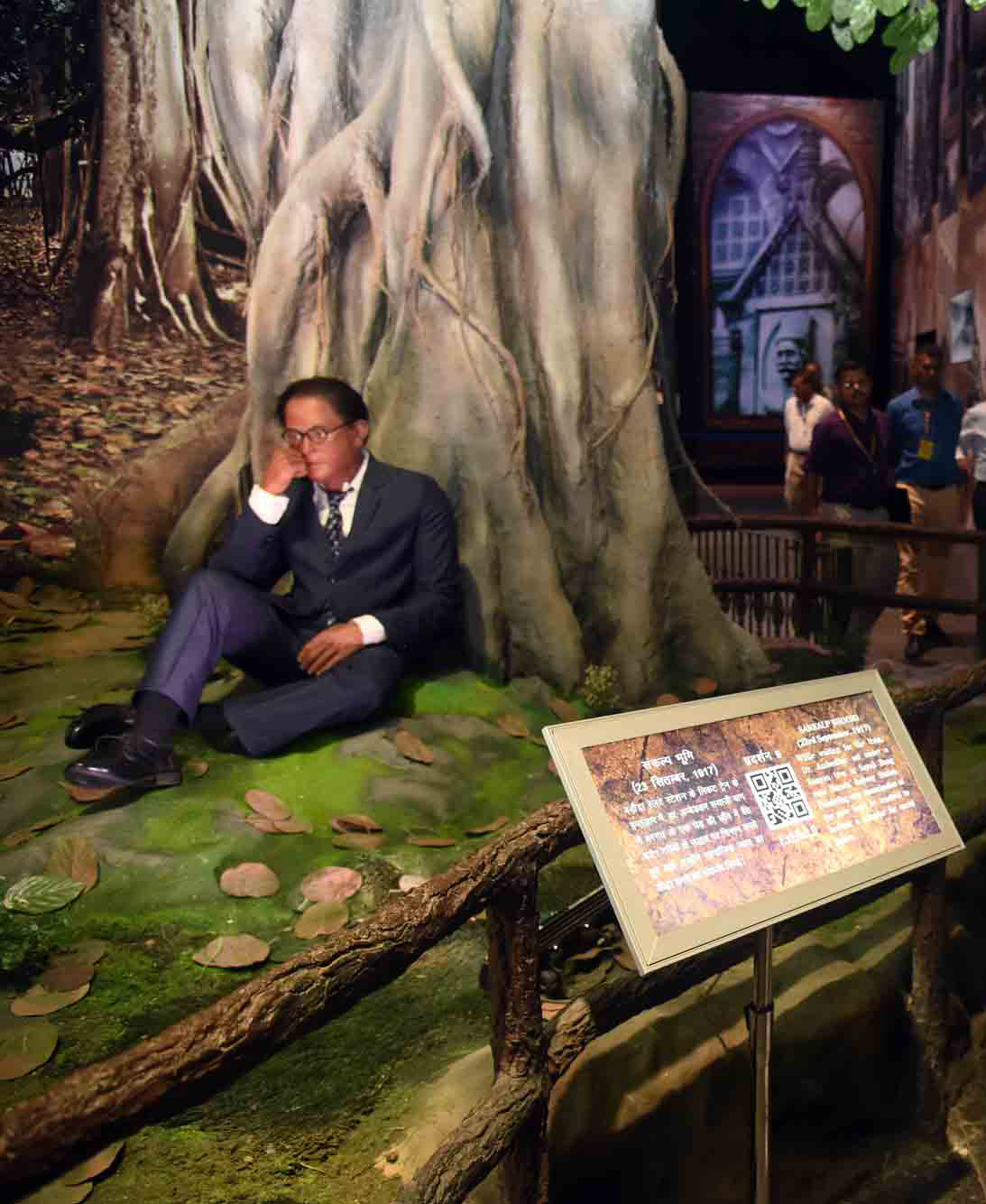
- Ambekdar sitting under a banyan tree
- Interactive map of the Dr. Ambedkar National Memorial area
- Former names: 26 Alipur Road, Dr Babasaheb Ambedkar Parinirvan Sthal

General information
- Location: 26 Sham Nath Marg, New Delhi, India
- Groundbreaking: 2016-03-21
- Construction started: 2016
- Construction stopped: 2018
- Inaugurated: 2018-04-13
- Cost: 99.64 crore
- Owner: Government of India
- Governing body: Ministry of Social Justice and Empowerment

Technical details
- Floor count: 4 (3 basements and ground floor)

Other information
- Parking: Basement 2 and 3 (capacity: 54 cars)
- Public transit: Delhi Metro: Vidhan Sabha and Civil Lines

Website
- ambedkarfoundation.nic.in

Dr. Ambedkar National Memorial, also known as Mahaparinirvan Bhoomi or Mahaparinirvan Sthal, is a memorial in India's national capital New Delhi, dedicated to anti-caste activist and political leader B. R. Ambedkar. The site is the location of 26 Alipur Road, a now-demolished bungalow where Ambedkar lived from 1951 until his death in 1956.

The Government of India acquired the site in 2003, and built a makeshift memorial at the site. The present-day memorial, which includes a museum with several exhibits, was built during 2016-2018.

== History ==
As the Minister of Law in the First Nehru ministry, Ambedkar lived at the official residences in India's national capital Delhi, first 22 Prithviraj Road and then 1 Hardinge Avenue. In September 1951, he resigned from the cabinet following the impasse over the Hindu Code Bill. Subsequently, he and his wife Savita moved to 26 Alipur Road (also spelt Alipore Road), a 10-room bungalow rented from the former ruler of Sirohi.

Ambedkar's assistant Nanak Chand Rattu visited 26 Alipur Road every evening, and typed several of his works there during 1951-1956. Ambedkar died at the bungalow on 6 December 1956. Savita Ambedkar continued to live there, and Ambedkar's papers remained in a storeroom. In 1966, Madan Lal Jain purchased the bungalow: he allowed Savita Ambedkar to retain two rooms, gave one part of the building to his son-in-law, and rented another part to an Additional Sessions Judge.

In 1967, Jain started the process to evict Savita Ambedkar, and the Additional Rent Controller served her the eviction notice on 17 January. A few days later, when Savita Ambedkar was away in Alwar, Jain and his son-law entered the bungalow with three bailiffs and 20 musclemen. They forced Savita Ambedkar's servant Mohan Singh to hand over the keys to her rooms, entered her rooms, and dumped her belongings in a yard. These included several B. R. Ambedkar's papers, which were destroyed in rain that night. Savita Ambedkar later sought help of the Home Minister Y.B. Chavan and the Lieutenant Governor of Delhi A.N. Jha to access her remaining belongings at the premises.

Soon after, the building was demolished and the property ownership changed. Amebdkar's surviving papers ultimately came in the possession of the Government of Maharashtra, and were later published as part of the Dr Babasaheb Ambedkar: Writings and Speeches (BAWS) series.

Jindal family, the new owners of the site, demolished the original building and built a new residence, informally called the "Jindal kothi".

=== Development as a memorial ===
At the time of Ambedkar's birth centenary in 1991, Ambedkarites demanded that the government acquire the house to build a memorial. More than a decade later, in 2003, the Bharatiya Janata Party (BJP)-led National Democratic Alliance government purchased the site to build a memorial. Prime Minister Atal Behari Vajpayee laid the foundation of the "Babasaheb Dr Ambedkar Parinirvan Sthal" at the site, planning to build a memorial and a museum. He conceived the site as a "pilgrimage where people from home and abroad would come to seek inspiration and learn how to eradicate social injustice."

After the BJP lost the election in 2004, Vajpayee's project was stalled. The NDA government had set up a ₹ 100 crore fund, which the new Congress-led UPA government directed towards other projects. The building remained a makeshift memorial managed by the government-run Dr. Ambedkar Foundation. In 2007, Ambedkarites submitted a memorandum to the government demanding better maintenance of the site, but the memorial remained neglected. Subsequently, the government had the bungalow whitewashed, its galleries cleaned-up, and its lawns beautified. However, the project to develop the new memorial remained on hold. In 2011, Prime Minister Manmohan Singh directed a high-level committee to work on the new memorial. The committee submitted its report in 2012, and the work was assigned to Central Public Works Department in 2013. No actual work on the memorial commenced, and the Ambedkarites accused the UPA government of neglecting the memorial because of Ambedkar's contentious history with the Congress.

In 2012, journalist Neha Bhatt of Outlook described the building as neglected: it had untended grounds, no fans, and no drinking water. Few people visited the memorial, so many of the rooms remained locked. The glass showcase containing a limited edition copy of the constitution was empty, as the copy had been locked away because of security concerns. The visitors book had several comments requesting a better memorial.

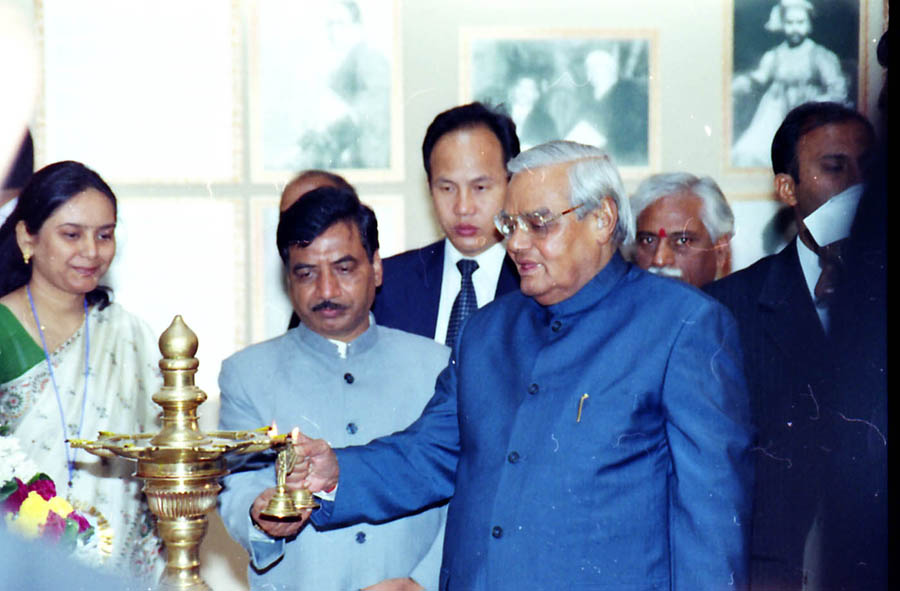
Atal Behari Vajpayee inaugurating the project in 2003

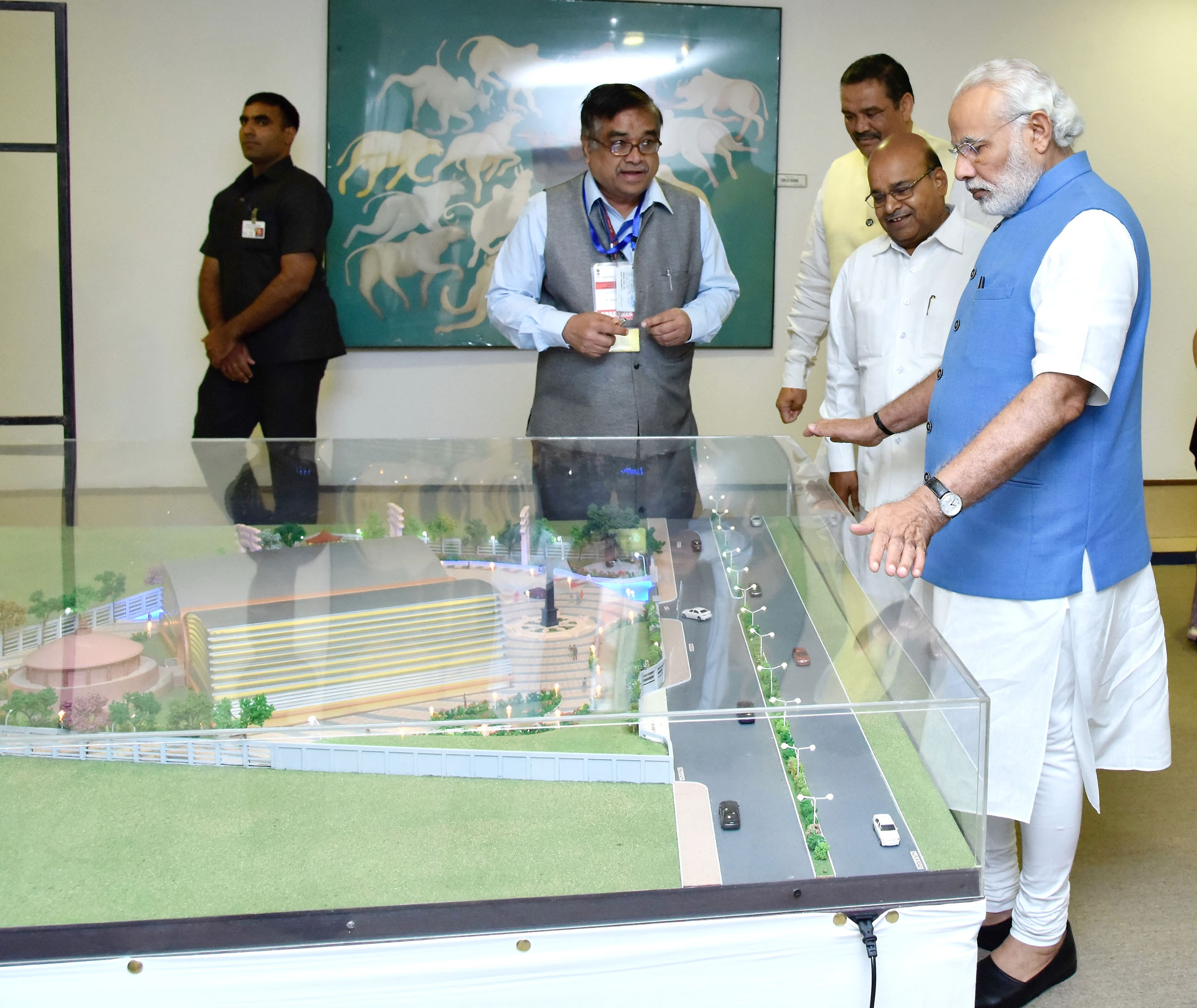
Narendra Modi laying the foundation stone in 2016

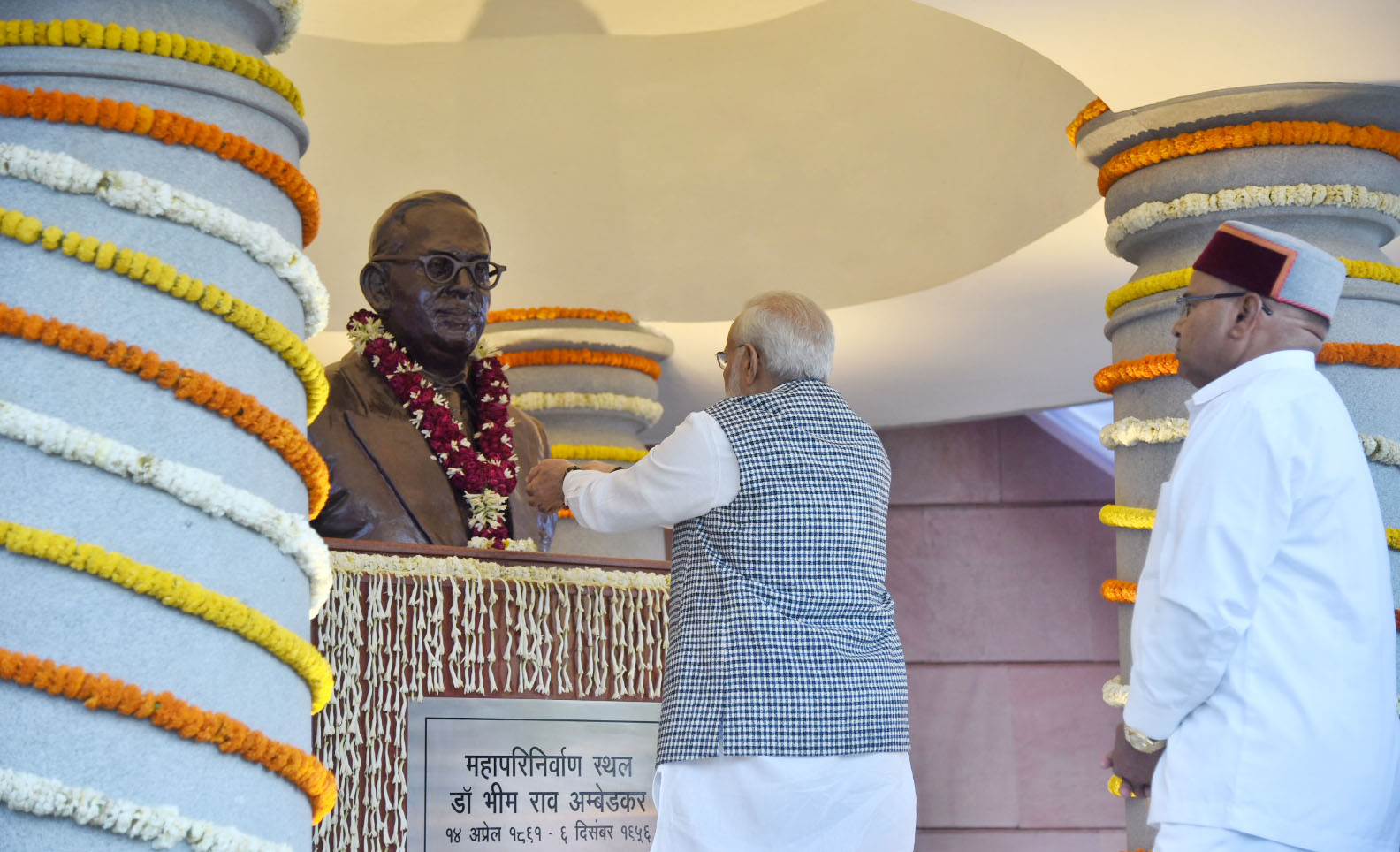
Narendra Modi inaugurating the new Memorial in 2018

After BJP returned to power in 2014, the Narendra Modi-led government announced plans to build a new memorial at the site. Modi accused the previous Congress-led government of closing the files related to Vajpayee's project, and delaying the construction of the new memorial for several years. In July 2015, the Government granted ₹ 99.64 crore for the construction of the new memorial.

Journalist Mayank Austen Soofi, who visited the memorial in 2015, before the construction of the present-day memorial started, described it as "deserted". The memorial had a museum with a large bust of Ambedkar, wall panels depicting milestones of Ambedkar's life and excerpts from his speeches, and a copy of the Constitution of India kept in a glass case. It also had a small library, which the Foundation's editor Sudhir Hilsayan described as "just for show". There was no librarian: the books were locked inside glass almirahs, and the caretaker of the memorial did not have the keys. The library was not air-conditioned, and the only tubelight was installed by the few student visitors who pooled in the money to buy it.

Modi laid the foundation stone of the present-day memorial on 21 March 2016. In 2018, the Modi government completed the project conceived by Vajpayee. Modi inaugurated the memorial on 13 April 2018 on Ambedkar's birth anniversary. BJP's critics accused it of attempting to appropriate Ambedkar through such memorials.

== Exhibits ==
The Memorial building is in the shape of an open book which signifies the Constitution of India. It houses a museum curated by the Ministry of Social Justice and Empowerment.

As Ambedkar had adopted Buddhism, the site incorporates several Buddhist elements, including a bronze Ashoka pillar at the entrance, a Bodhi tree surrounded by fountains with that move to Buddhist chants in a sound and light show, and two Sanchi-style toranas (gateways). The memorial features 27 exhibits, including:

- a life-size exhibit of Ambedkar sitting under a tree in Vadodara after losing his job
- a re-creation of Ambedkar's study
- several leaders signing the first copy of the Constitution of India
- a life-size robotic statue of Ambedkar that narrates his speeches in the Constituent Assembly
- an exhibit on Ambedkar's wife Ramabai which shows the impact of her death on Ambedkar's life

== See also ==
- Statue of Social Justice, Vijayawada
- Statue of Equality, Mumbai
- Ambedkar Memorial Park
- List of things named after B. R. Ambedkar
