= Minoo Masani =

Indian politician (1905–1998)

Indian Ambassador to Brazil
- In office May 1948 – May 1949
- President: Rajendra Prasad
- Succeeded by: Joginder Sen Bahadur

Member of Parliament, Lok Sabha
- In office 1957–1962
- Preceded by: Abdul Ibrahim
- Succeeded by: P. K. Ghosh
- Constituency: Ranchi (Lok Sabha constituency)
- In office 1967–1971
- Preceded by: U. N. Dhebar
- Succeeded by: Ghanshyambhai Oza
- Constituency: Rajkot (Lok Sabha constituency)

Personal details
- Born: Minocher Rustom Masani; 20 November 1905 Mumbai, Maharashtra, India
- Died: 27 May 1998 (aged 92) Mumbai, Maharashtra, India
- Party: Swatantra Party
- Other political affiliations: Indian National Congress
- Occupation: Journalist, Politician, Writer, Diplomat
- Known for: Promotion of liberal economy

Minocher Rustom "Minoo" Masani (20 November 1905 – 27 May 1998) was an Indian politician, a leading figure of the erstwhile Swatantra Party. He was a three-time Member of Parliament, representing Gujarat's Rajkot constituency in the second, third and fourth Lok Sabha. A Parsi, he was among the founders of the Indian Liberal Group think tank that promoted classical liberalism.

He served as a member of the Constituent Assembly of India, representing the Indian National Congress. His proposal for a uniform civil code to be included in the Constitution of India in 1947 was rejected.

His public life began in the Mumbai Municipal Corporation, where he was elected as Mayor in 1943. He also became a member of the Indian Legislative Assembly. In August 1960, he along with C. Rajagopalachari and N. G. Ranga formed the Swatantra Party, while international Communism was at its peak.

He died, aged 92, in his home at Breach Candy, Mumbai. His funeral was held at Chandanwadi.

== Early life ==
Minocher (Minoo) Rustom Masani was born to Sir Rustom Masani who was a municipal commissioner of erstwhile Bombay and Vice chancellor of Bombay University. Masani was educated in Bombay before he moved to London where he studied at the London School of Economics and he obtained his bachelor's degree in law before training as a barrister at the Lincoln's Inn in 1928.

== Political life ==
He began his professional life as an advocate at the Bombay High Court in 1929 before joining the Indian independence movement the following year, during the civil disobedience campaign. He was arrested several times by British for his participation in the movement. He was in the Nashik jail in 1932 when Jayaprakash Narayan came in contact with him and they launched the Congress Socialist Party in 1934 together. He participated in the Quit India Movement in 1942 and was jailed again. After his jail term was over he entered legislative politics, He got elected mayor of Bombay Municipal Corporation. Masani was a close friend of Jawaharlal Nehru. He also became a member of the Indian Legislative Assembly.

After Stalin's Great Purge and takeover of Eastern Europe, Masani moved away from Socialism and became a supporter of free market economics. Post-independence, Masani's political convictions propelled him to support "democratic socialism" in India as it "avoided monopoly, private or public". He withdrew from politics for a while. He was India's representative to UN Sub-Commission on Minorities. He did not see eye to eye with the Nehru government on USSR's treatment of minorities, so he was withdrawn from the commission and appointed as Indian Ambassador to Brazil in May 1948 for one year. After his stint in Brazil, He returned to India and became the chef de cabinet to the Chairman of Tata group J.R.D Tata. In 1950 he founded 'Freedom First', a monthly magazine in cause of liberal policy and politics. He went back to electoral politics and got elected to Loksabha in 1957 from Ranchi as an independent candidate. In 1959 he founded Swatantra Party along with C Rajagopalachari. He won a by election from Rajkot as a Swatantra party candidate. He represented Rajkot until 1971. He was one of the few politicians who staunchly opposed the nationalisation of banks by Prime Minister Indira Gandhi. He argued that nationalization would deprive both the depositors and borrowers of the freedom to choose between competing banks who will then be forced to encounter a "soulless monopoly". He predicted that public confidence in the banking sector would decline due to the bureaucratic inefficiency. He further warned that state ownership would make banks vulnerable to “political influence, graft and corruption” and argued that, like other state enterprises, they would ultimately operate at a loss. Swatantra's party was India's single-largest opposition party in Parliament and Masani being its leader in Loksabha, initiated debate on finance bills and forced the Congress government to work rigorously. He also headed the PAC. A collection of his speeches were published as Congress Misrule and Swatantra Alternative. In 1971 general elections Swatantra party did not perform well and he resigned the position of the party president.

After 1971 he kept writing and editing his magazine Freedom First. This put him against the Congress Government when the government issued a censorship order on the magazine. He fought the order in court and won.

== Personal life ==
Masani married four times. His first wife was English and the marriage ended in divorce. His second marriage also ended in divorce. Minoo met Shakuntala Srivastava the daughter of Jwala Prasad Srivastava, an influential British loyalist during the Quit India movement. They married despite opposition from their respective families. They had a son Zareer Masani. This marriage too ended in divorce in 1989.

== Works ==
Masani was also an author and has written many books. His first book, Our India, was a best seller and even a prescribed text book in pre-independence India.

- Zoroastrianism: The Religion Of The Good Life (1938)
- Our India (1940)
- Socialism Reconsidered (1944)
- Picture of a Plan (1945)
- A Plea for a Mixed Economy (1947)
- Our Growing Human Family (1950)
- Neutralism in India (1951)
- The Communist Party of India: A Short History (1954)
- Congress Misrule and Swatantra Alternative (1967)
- Too Much Politics, Too Little Citizenship (1969)
- Liberalism (1970)
- Folklore of wells: being a study of water-worship in East and West (1974)
- The Constitution, Twenty Years Later (1975)
- Bliss was it in that Dawn ... (1977)
- Against the tide (1981)
- We Indians (1989)
- Masani, M.R. (1961). The Future of Free Enterprise in India: Forum of Free Enterprise. Forum of Free Enterprise.

== Bibliography ==
- B. K. Karanjia (1970). Rustom Masani: Portrait of a Citizen. Popular Prakashan.
