= Indian Liberal Group =

Think tank in Mumbai, India

- Established: 1965
- Founder: Minoo Masani
- Type: Libertarian think tank
- Headquarters: First Floor, Sassoon Building, 143, Mahatma Gandhi Road Mumbai 400001 India
- Location: Mumbai
- President: Meera Sanyal

The Indian Liberal Group is a think tank founded in 1965 by Minoo Masani, author and parliamentarian, to promote the liberal point of view and educate the public on the concept of libertarianism. Its headquarters is in Mumbai. Meera Sanyal serves as the current president.

== Organization structure ==
The ILG has local chapters, a state executive and a national executive. National Conventions are held every two years. All current members of the organization can attend the National Convention, which serves as the policy making body.

== People ==
Among the founding members of the Group were Prof. B. R. Shenoy, H.V.R. Iyengar, Fredie Mehta, Khushwant Singh, Sophie Wadia, and G V Sundaram. S.V. Raju is the immediate past president of the organization.

== Activities ==
Indian Liberal Group presents a Liberal Budget every year as an alternative version to the Annual Budget presented to the Parliament by the Union Finance Minister. Eminent economists are part of the drafting committees of these Liberal Budgets.

On October 8 and 9, 2010, ILG organized a symposium titled "India - the next decade" in Mumbai.

The local chapters organize perform a variety of activities like Minoo Masani Memorial Lectures, protests for the cause of Bhopal Gas Tragedy victims, organising a 'parliament of students' on board exams and campaigns to improve the quality of education in Medical colleges.
