= Sakruli =

- village
- Country: India
- State: Punjab

Languages
  - Official: Punjabi
- Time zone: UTC+5:30 (IST)

Sakruli is a village in Punjab, India.

It is located in the Hoshiarpur district of Punjab state.

== Geography ==
The latitude 31.3271903 and longitude 76.0225084 are the geocoordinate of the Sakruli. Chandigarh is the state capital for Sakruli village. It is located around 96.6 kilometer away from Sakruli.. The other nearest state capital from Sakruli is Chandigarh and its distance is 96.6 km.

The other surrounding state capitals are Chandigarh (96.6 km), Shimla (110.8 km)., Dehradun (230.5 km).

== Time ==
It is located in the UTC 5.30 time zone and it follows Indian standard time (IST). The sun rise time varies 26 minutes from IST. The vehicle driving side in Sakruli is left, all vehicles should take left side during driving. Sakruli people are using its national currency which is Indian Rupee and its international currency code is INR.

Mobile phones can be accessed by adding the Indian country dialing code +91 from abroad. Sakruli people are following the dd/mm/yyyy date format in day-to-day life. Sakruli domain name extension( country code top-level domain (cTLD)) is .in

== Official language ==
The native language of Sakruli is Punjabi and English most of the village people speak Punjabi. Sakruli people use Punjabi language for communication.

== Nearest railway station ==
The nearest railway station to Sakruli is Mahngarwal Doaba which is located in and around 6.5 kilometer distance.

The following table shows other railway stations and its distance:

- Mahngarwal Doaba railway station 6.5 km.
- Satnaur Badesron railway station 10.6 km.
- Garhshankar railway station 15.9 km. Khatkar Kalan railway station 18.1 km.
- Hoshiarpur railway station 24.6 km.

== Nearest airport ==
- Sakruli's nearest airport is Sahnewal Airport situated at 53.3 km distance.
- Few more airports around Sakruli are as follows.
- Sahnewal Airport 53.3 km.
- Halwara Air Force Station 74.4 km.
- Gaggal Airport 96.0 km.

== Nearest districts ==
Sakruli is located around 25.0 kilometer away from its district headquarter hoshiarpur.

The other nearest district headquarters is nawanshahr situated at 24.1 km distance from Sakruli .

== Surrounding districts ==
Shahid_Bhagat_Singh_Nagar (nawanshahr ) district 24.1 km.

- Una ( una ) district 28.4 km.
- Rupnagar ( rupnagar ) district 61.1 km.
- Kapurthala ( kapurthala ) district 61.3 km

== Nearest town/city ==
Nearest town/city/important place is Mahilpur located at the distance of 3.8 kilometer.
