= Vikas Mahatme =

Indian ophthalmologist

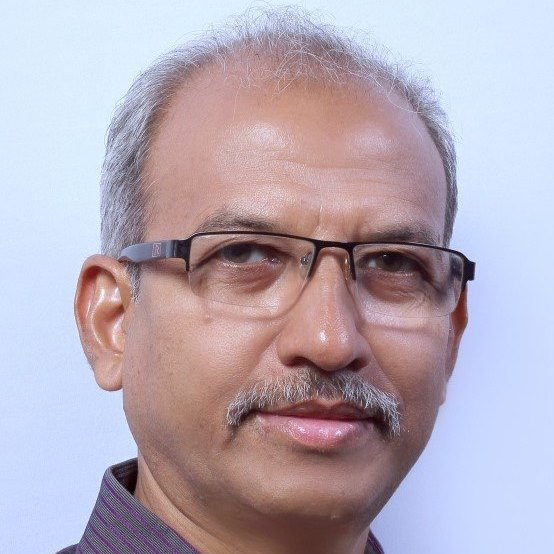

Member of Parliament, Rajya Sabha
- In office 5 July 2016 – 2 April 2022
- Constituency: Maharashtra

Personal details
- Born: 11 December 1957 (age 68)
- Party: BJP
- Spouse: Sunita Mahatme
- Children: 1
- Profession: Politician, Ophthalmologist
- Website: www.mahatmehospital.com

Vikas Mahatme (born 11 December 1957) is Padmashri Awarded Indian ophthalmologist, social entrepreneur, and former member of the Parliament in Rajya Sabha. Born in Amravati, he comes from Nagpur in the state of Maharashtra. He founded S. Mahatme Eye Welfare Charitable Trust, which runs Mahatme Eye Bank eye hospital in Nagpur as well as branches in Mumbai, Amravati, Gadchiroli and Pune. He received the Padma Shri for his charitable community work as an ophthalmologist. In June 2016, Mahatme was the Bharatiya Janata Party's candidate for the Rajya Sabha biennial elections, which he won unopposed. His candidacy was backed by Maharashtra Chief Minister Devendra Fadnavis and Union Minister Nitin Gadkari. He belongs to the Dhangar community. He has expressed support for implementing Scheduled Tribe reservation for the Dhangar community in Maharashtra and is its first community member to get elected to parliament. He is currently a member of the Indian Nursing Council.

== Early life and education ==
Born in December 1957 in remote Wathoda Shukleswar village in Amravati, he underwent many struggles during his childhood, including lacking electricity and other basic infrastructure. He used to go to a friend's house to study under the light, as he didn't have electricity at his house. He moved to Nagpur while his father was serving in a central excise job, where he continued his education until postgraduation in the Government Medical College situated there. After his MBBS and a masters in surgery in ophthalmology, he opened a clinic in the courtyard of his house on the outskirts of Nagpur. He has also been a lecturer in the Department of Ophthalmology in Government Medical College at Nagpur.

== Professional career as an ophthalmologist ==
=== Personal achievements ===
Mahatme has been invited to demonstrate his surgical skills in various countries, including Malaysia, Indonesia, Romania, Russia, Egypt, Iraq, as well as various places in India. He is credited for developing 'Woodcutter's Nucleus Cracking’, a modern technique for phacoemulsification. He also developed a pigment for Corneal Tattooing and Filtration Enhancing knot for glaucoma surgeries. Mahatme has successfully performed over one lakh eye surgeries. He is the first ophthalmologist to demonstrate live surgery telecasted via-two way audio-video conferencing in 32 cities in India simultaneously.

He is associated with the National Programme of Control of Blindness (N.P.C.B.). He has been the President of the Geriatric Society of India. He is an active member of the American Academy of Ophthalmology (A.A.O.), All India Ophthalmological Society (A.I.O.S.), D.O.S., M.O.S., V.O.S., and N.A.O. He has worked with various international NGOs including Sight Saver, Help-Age India, Impact India, Empathy Foundation, Orbis International, RPG Foundation, SAAD Foundation, Volkart Foundation, Vision 2020. He is a member of the Indian Nursing Council. He was awarded the Col. Rangachari Award by the All India Ophthalmological Society for the best paper read at the special plenary session of annual conference in 1996.

In May 2024, the Ministry of Health and Family Welfare nominated Mahatme as the president of the All India Institute of Medical Sciences, Nagpur.

=== Mahatme Eye Bank & Eye Hospital ===
He is the founder and medical director of Mahatme Eye Bank & Eye Hospital, Nagpur which is a recognized postgraduate teaching institute run by S.M.M. Eye Welfare Charitable Trust. As of 2017, the hospital has performed over 180,000 eye operations, out of which over 80,000 operations have been carried out free of cost. The hospital is recognized by the International Council of Ophthalmology (I.C.O.) for surgical training and fellowship. The Government of India recognized the hospital as a surgical training institute, which has trained over 1,500 ophthalmologists in India and across the globe through its surgical training programs on an International Level until 2017.

== Social works ==
=== Public access to medical facilities ===
Mahatme was the first person to start an eye bank in the Vidarbha region of Maharashtra and established an eye donation movement there. He also runs several eye hospitals and vision centres in Central India including Nagpur, Amravati, Gadchiroli, and Mumbai. He is working for community outreach programmes in eye care since 1986. His team visits rural, tribal and slum areas and conducts eye screening camps. He pioneered setting up hospitals and mobile eye-units at several places including Nagpur, Mumbai, Amravati, Gadchiroli Melghat, Yavatmal, Gondia, and Chandrapur. He started Aankhwali Pum-Pum (a mobile eye unit) equipped to administer eye check-up to cater to remote rural areas.

=== Health awareness campaigns ===
Mahatme has launched the 'Right to Health Movement,' to make people aware about their health rights and about various government health programs. He famously gave the slogan- ‘Health is my Womb-right.’ The trust organises a free eye camp every year for lakhs of people coming to Deekshabhoomi, Nagpur on the occasion of Dhamma Chakra Pravarthan Din.

=== Social and emotional awareness initiatives ===
Mahatme gave a narrative presentation titled "Happy Meaningful Life" to several places in India and abroad. He also founded the 'Institute of Science of Happiness' which gives emphasis on developing thinking skills amongst young generation and empowering them with ten life skills underlined by the World Health Organization. Mahatme conducts regular programmes on personality development for N.C.C. and other students.

=== Upliftment of Dhangar community ===
Mahatme is a leader of the Dhangar community and continuously works on their problems in Maharashtra. To agitate for the demand of Scheduled Tribe reservation for Dhangars, he led a three-lakh strong march to Winter Assembly, Nagpur on 19 December 2013 and again on 8 December 2015 attended by around 5-6 lakh people. He further organized a huge convention of the community on 4 January 2015 and 5 November 2017, which were attended by the Devendra Fadnavis, Chief Minister of Maharashtra. His ability to unite the Dhangar community played a significant role in influencing political change at both the central and state levels. He is the former president of the Maharashtra-based organisation Dhangar Samaj Sangharsh Samiti, Maharashtra Rajya, which campaigns for reservation for the Dhangar community in government jobs and educational institutions.

=== Others ===
His other concerns include the shepherd community of Maharashtra. He is currently pursuing the matter with the government about passes for sheep grazing confined sheep rearing etc. The Government of Maharashtra recognized his efforts by nominated him on the committee dealing with grazing problems of shepherds in Maharashtra. He went on to develop a model of totally confined sheep farm near Nagpur, inaugurated by Shri Nitin Gadkari, Hon'ble Minister of Road Transport and Highways.

== Political career ==
In July 2016, Mahatme contested Rajya Sabha biennial elections and emerged victorious unopposed. Since then, he has been actively involved in Parliamentary work by participating in various Parliamentary Committees. He has been a Member in the Central Coordination Committee since July 2016, and a former member of the Committee on Science and Technology, Environment and Forests, from July to September 2016. Currently he is a member of the Committee on Health and Family Welfare, Committee on Welfare of Other Backward Classes (OBCs), Railway Consultative committee, and Indian Nursing Council.

He also works for BJP's Vaidyakeey Aghadi / Deen Dayal Upadhyay Institute of Medical Science Research and Human Resources.

== Awards and recognitions ==
In 2010, he was awarded with Padma Shri by the Honorable President of India for his contribution to ophthalmology and social work. He has also been recognized with Col. Rangachari National Award and gold medal for his contribution on ‘rectal mucous membrane graft for dry eye syndrome’.

== Personal life ==
He married Sunita in 1992, who is a Gynaecologist by profession. The couple has a son.
