= Dalit Buddhist movement =

Modern sociopolitical movement among Dalits

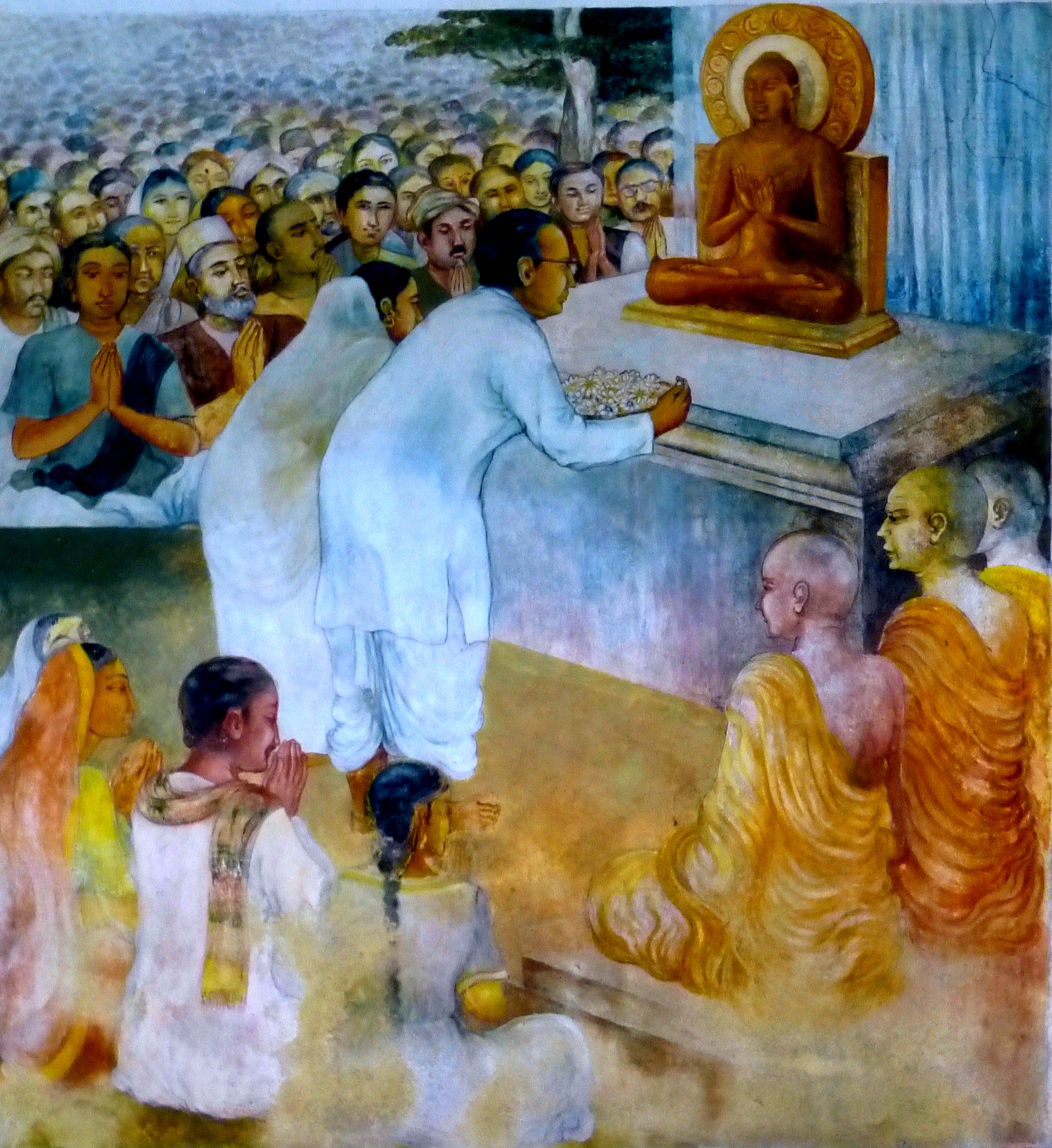
The Buddhist Movement for the oppressed was begun by Ambedkar when he converted with his followers in 1956 in Deekshabhoomi, Nagpur.

The Dalit Buddhist movement (Note: Also known as the Neo-Buddhist movement, Buddhist movement for Dalits, Ambedkarite Buddhist movement and Modern Buddhist movement.) is a religious as well as a socio-political movement among Dalits in India which was started by B. R. Ambedkar. He reinterpreted Buddhism and created a new school of Buddhism called Navayana. The movement has sought to be a socially and politically engaged form of Buddhism.

The movement was launched in 1956 by Ambedkar when nearly half a million Dalits, formerly untouchables, joined him and converted to Navayana Buddhism. It rejected Hinduism, challenged the caste system in India and promoted the rights of the Dalit community. The movement also rejected the teachings of Mahayana, Theravada and Vajrayana traditions of Buddhism; instead, the movement claims to be a form of engaged Buddhism as taught by Ambedkar.

== History ==
Buddhism originated in ancient India and grew after Ashoka adopted it. By the 2nd century CE, Buddhism was widespread in India and had expanded outside of India into Central Asia, East Asia and parts of Southeast Asia. During the Middle Ages, Buddhism slowly declined in India, while it vanished from Persia and Central Asia as Islam became the state religion.

According to Randall Collins, Buddhism was already declining in India by the 12th century, but with the pillage by Muslim invaders it nearly became extinct in India. In the 13th century, states Craig Lockard, Buddhist monks in India fled to Tibet to escape Islamic persecution, while the monks in western India, states Peter Harvey, escaped persecution by moving to south Indian Hindu kingdoms that were able to resist the Muslim power.

Efforts to revive Buddhism in India began in the 19th century, such as with the efforts of Sri Lankan Buddhist leader Anagarika Dharmapala who founded the Maha Bodhi Society. The Maha Bodhi Society, according to Bhagwan Das, was not a Dalit movement however, because it mainly attracted upper-caste Hindus to Buddhism.

=== Northern India ===
The two Adi Dharma movements – those that rejected Hinduism in favor of Buddhism – were launched by the Swami Achhutanand Harihar in Uttar Pradesh and Babu Mangu Ram in Punjab.

Born in an untouchable family, Achhutanand joined the Arya Samaj suddhi reform movement and worked there for about eight years (1905–1912). He felt Arya Samaj practiced untouchability in subtle ways, and subsequently left it to launch the socio-political Bharitiya Achhut Mahasabha movement. Achhutanand published the Adi-Hindu magazine, wherein he called on Dalits to return to Adi-Dharma as the "original religion of Indians." Achhutanand formulated his philosophy on the basis of a shared cultural and ethnic identity. He presented it to an audience beyond just Dalits, including tribal societies as well. He opposed Mahatma Gandhi's non-cooperation movement and fasts as well as the Indian National Congress, stating that Brahmins were "as foreign to India as were the British", according to Anand Teltumbde.

Babu Mangu Ram was also born in an untouchable family of Punjab with a flourishing leather trade. Mangu Ram arrived in the United States in 1909 at the age of 23 and worked in California. There, he joined the Ghadar Party and smuggled weapons from California to India in order to oppose British rule. In 1925, he shifted his focus onto Dalit freedom, launching the "Ad Dharm" movement as well as a weekly newspaper titled Adi-Danka to spread his ideas. According to Teltumbde, Mandu Ram's religious movement failed to materialize, and Mangu Ram later joined the Ambedkarite movement.

In 1914, Prakash was ordained as a Bodhanand Mahastavir in Calcutta, and began preaching Buddhism in Lucknow. He founded the Bharatiye Buddh Samiti in 1916, and set up a vihara in 1928.

=== Southern India ===
In 1898, Pandit Iyothee Thass founded the Sakya Buddhist Society also known as Indian Buddhist Association in Tamil Nadu. He presented Buddhism as a religious alternative to Hinduism for Dalits. Thass's efforts led to the creation of a broader movement amongst Tamil Dalits in South India until the 1950s. The first president of the Indian Buddhist Association was Paul Carus. Unlike the Ambedkarite movement, the Indian Buddhist Association adopted the Theravada Buddhism tradition founded in Sri Lanka (where Thass had received his training and initiation in Buddhism).

== B. R. Ambedkar ==
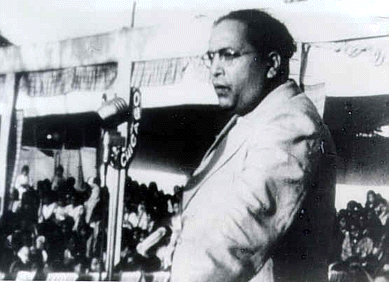
Ambedkar delivering a speech to a rally at Yeola, Nashik, on 13 October 1935

Ambedkar was an Indian leader, influential during the colonial era and post-independence period of India. He belonged to a Dalit community, traditionally the most oppressed and marginalized group in Indian society. He was the fourteenth child in an impoverished Maharashtra Dalit family, who studied abroad, returned to India in the 1920s and joined the political movement. His focus was social and political rights of the Dalits.

During 1931–32, the Mahatma Gandhi led Indian independence movement held discussions with the British government over the Round Table Conferences. They sought constitutional reforms as a preparation to the end of colonial British rule, and begin the self-rule by Indians. The British side sought reforms that would keep the Indian subcontinent as a colony. The British negotiators proposed constitutional reforms on a British Dominion model that established separate electorates based on religious and social divisions. They invited Indian religious leaders, such as Muslims and Sikhs, to press their demands along religious lines, as well as B. R. Ambedkar as the representative leader of the untouchables. Gandhi vehemently opposed a constitution that enshrined rights or representations based on communal divisions, because he feared that such a constitution would not bring people together but divide them, perpetuate their status and divert the attention from India's struggle to end the colonial rule.

After Gandhi returned from Second Round Table conference, he started a new satyagraha. He was immediately arrested and imprisoned at the Yerwada Jail, Pune. While he was in prison, the British government enacted a new law that granted untouchables a separate electorate. It came to be known as the Communal Award. In protest, Gandhi started fast-unto-death, while he was held in prison. The resulting public outcry forced the government, in consultations with Ambedkar, to replace the Communal Award with a compromise Poona Pact.

Ambedkar accepted the Poona Pact under public pressure, but disagreed with Gandhi and his political methods. He dismissed Gandhi's ideas as loved by "blind Hindu devotees", primitive, influenced by spurious brew of Tolstoy and Ruskin, and "there is always some simpleton to preach them".

Ambedkar concluded that Dalits must leave Hinduism and convert to another religion, and announced his intent to leave Hinduism in 1935. He considered Islam, Christianity, Sikhism, Zoroastrianism and Buddhism. Ambedkar was approached by various leaders of different denominations and faiths. On 22 May 1936, an "All Religious Conference" was held at Lucknow. It was attended by prominent Dalit leaders including Jagjivan Ram, though Ambedkar could not attend it. At the conference, Muslim, Christian, Sikh, and Buddhist representatives presented the tenets of their respective religions in an effort to win over Dalits. Ambedkar rejected the other religions and chose Buddhism. However, Ambedkar remained a Hindu for the next 20 years, studied then reinterpreted Buddhism, and adopted Neo-Buddhism or Navayana few weeks before his death.

The Italian Buddhist monk Lokanatha visited Ambedkar's residence at Dadar on 10 June 1936. Later in an interview to the press, Lokanatha said that Ambedkar was impressed with Buddhism.

=== Navayana Buddhism ===
According to mainstream interpretations of Ambedkar's views, several of the core beliefs and doctrines of traditional Buddhist traditions such as the Four Noble Truths and Anatta were flawed and pessimistic, and may have been inserted into the Buddhist scriptures by wrong-headed Buddhist monks of a later era. These should not be considered as Buddha's teachings in their interpretation of Ambedkar's views, although there is no empirical evidence of the followers of this sect rejecting any of these concepts outright. Other foundational concepts of Buddhism such as Karma and Rebirth were seen to be considered as superstitions by Ambedkar according to them.

Navayana as formulated by Ambedkar and at the root of Dalit Buddhist movement heavily reinterprets mainstream traditional Buddhist practices and precepts such as the institution of monk after renunciation, ideas such as karma, rebirth in afterlife, samsara, meditation, nirvana and Four Noble Truths. Sources focussed on mainstream branches of Buddhism posit that all such concepts were rejected by Ambedkar, although all such concepts are only reinterpreted in his work The Buddha and His Dhamma, the commentary of Ambedkar on Buddhism and thus the elaboration of all his interpretations. Ambedkar's new sect of Buddhism reinterpreted the Buddha's religion in terms of social equality.

Ambedkar called his version of Buddhism Navayana or Neo-Buddhism. His book, The Buddha and His Dhamma, is the holy book of Navayana or Dalit Buddhists. According to Junghare, for the followers of Navyana, Ambedkar has become a deity and he is worshipped in its practice.

=== Ambedkar's conversion ===
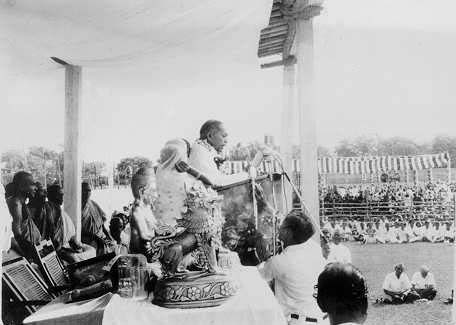
Ambedkar delivering speech during conversion, Nagpur, 14 October 1956

After publishing a series of books and articles arguing that Buddhism was the only way for the Untouchables to gain equality, Ambedkar publicly converted on 14 October 1956, at Deekshabhoomi, Nagpur, over 20 years after he declared his intent to convert. Around 365,000 of his followers converted to Buddhism at the same ceremony. On this occasion, many upper caste Hindus too accepted Buddhism. After Nagpur, on 16 October 1956, Ambedkar again gave Buddhism to more than 300,000 of his followers at Chandrapur, since the place is also known as Deekshabhoomi. Inspired by this Ambedkar's conversion, 5,000 Tamils of Myanmar had accepted Buddhism in Rangoon under the leadership of Chan Htoon, the justice of the Supreme Court of the Union of Burma on 28 October 1956. As a result of Ambedkar's movement, nearly three million Dalits converted to Buddhism, increasing the Buddhist population by 1,697% according to the 1961 census.

Growth of Buddhism in Maharashtra and Other States and UTs of India (1951–2011)

The conversion ceremony was attended by Medharathi, his main disciple Bhoj Dev Mudit, and Mahastvir Bodhanand's Sri Lankan successor, Bhante Pragyanand. Ambedkar asked Dalits not to get entangled in the existing branches of Buddhism (Theravada, Mahayana and Vajrayana), and called his version Navayana or 'Neo-Buddhism'. Ambedkar would die less than two months later, just after finishing his definitive work on Buddhism.

Many Dalits employ the term "Ambedkar(ite) Buddhism" to designate the Buddhist movement, which started with Ambedkar's conversion. Converted people call themselves "-Bauddha" i.e. Buddhists.

=== Twenty-two vows ===
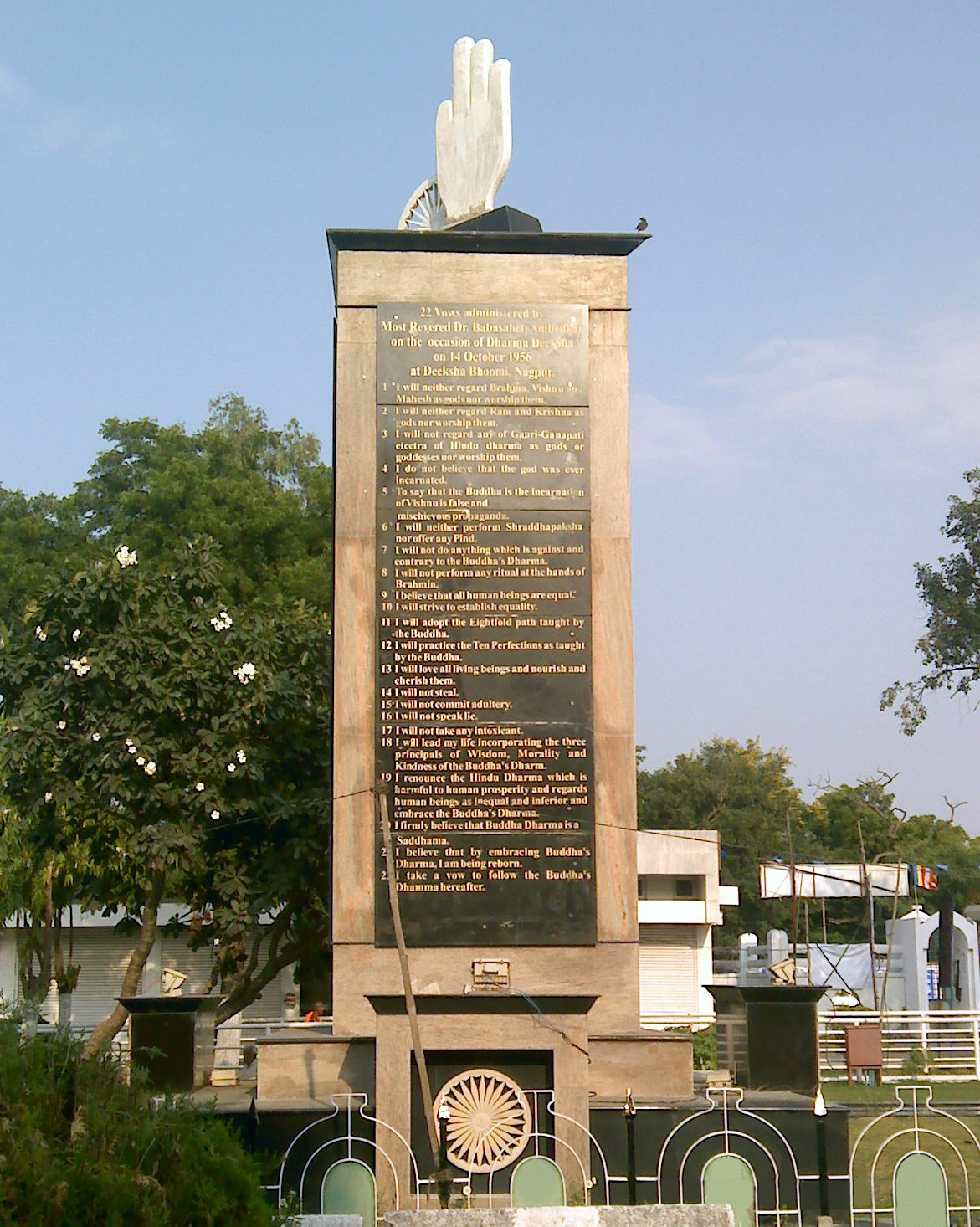
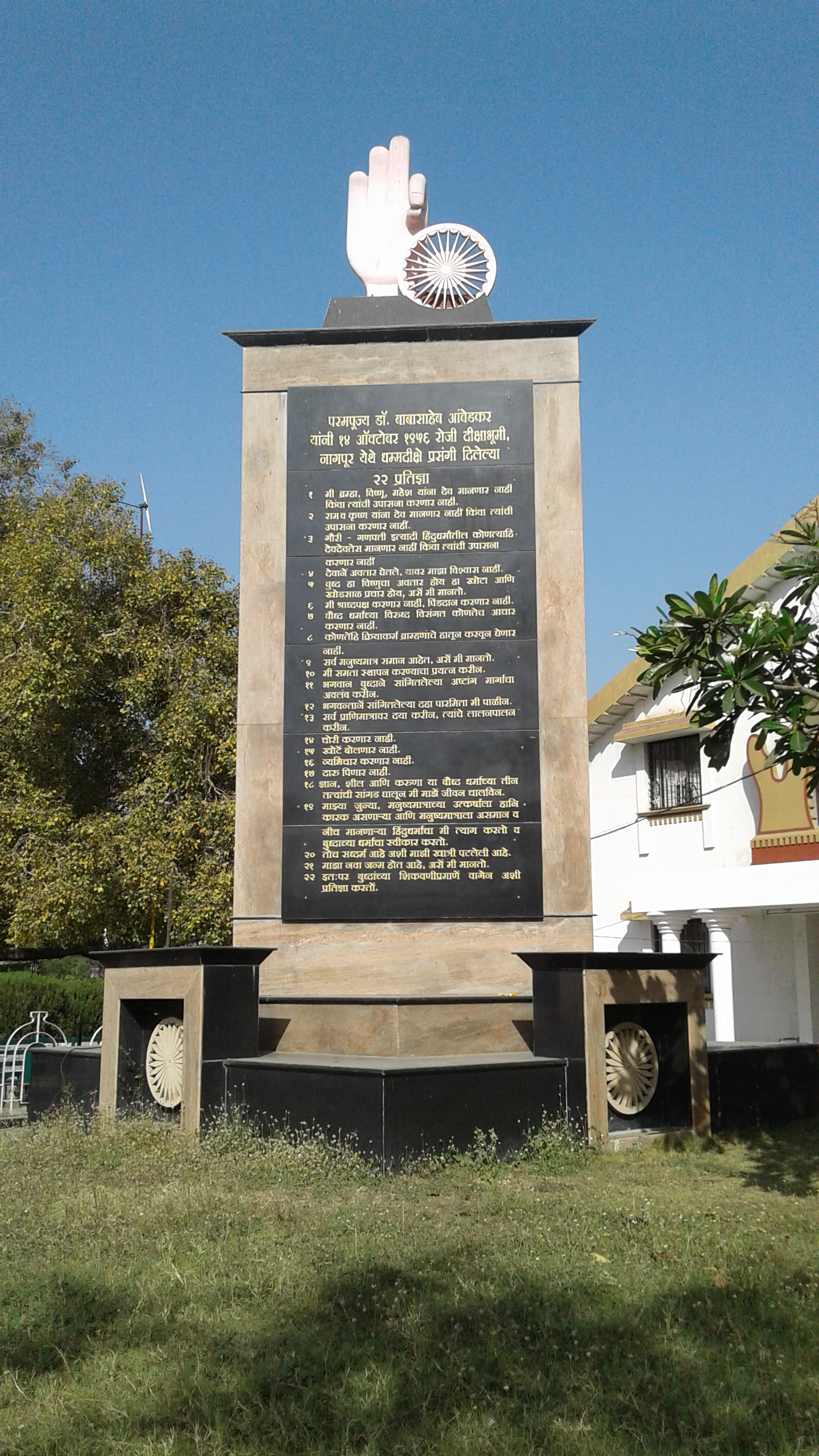
Inscription of the 22 vows at Deekshabhoomi in English and Marathi, respectively

The Twenty-two vows or twenty-two pledges are the 22 Buddhist vows administered by B. R. Ambedkar, the revivalist of Buddhism in India, to his followers. On converting to Buddhism, Ambedkar made 22 vows, and asked his 400,000 supporters to do the same. After receiving lay ordination, Ambedkar gave dhamma diksha to his followers. This ceremony organised on 14 October 1956 in Nagpur included 22 vows administered to all new converts after Three Jewels and Five Precepts. On 16 October 1956, Ambedkar performed another mass religious conversion ceremony at Chandrapur.

It is believed by Ambedkarite Buddhists that these vows are the guidelines of the social revolution that motivates human instincts. These vows demonstrate both the social movement aspect of Navayana Buddhism, and demonstrate its core deviation from earlier schools of Buddhism. In India, these vows are taken as an oath by individuals or groups of people when they convert to Buddhism.

== After Ambedkar's death ==
The Buddhist movement was somewhat hindered by Ambedkar's death in 1956 so shortly after his conversion. It did not receive the immediate mass support from the Untouchable population that Ambedkar had hoped for. Division and lack of direction among the leaders of the Ambedkarite movement have been an additional impediment. However, in 1990, Scheduled Caste status was extended to individuals converted to Buddhism, which contributed to a 35.3% increase in the total Buddhist population from 4,719,796 in 1981 to 6,387,500 in 1991. According to the 2011 census, there are currently 8.44 million Buddhists in India among which 5.76 million are SCs, at least 6.5 million of whom are Marathi Buddhists in Maharashtra. This makes Buddhism the fifth-largest religion in India and 6% of the population of Maharashtra, but less than 1% of the overall population of India.

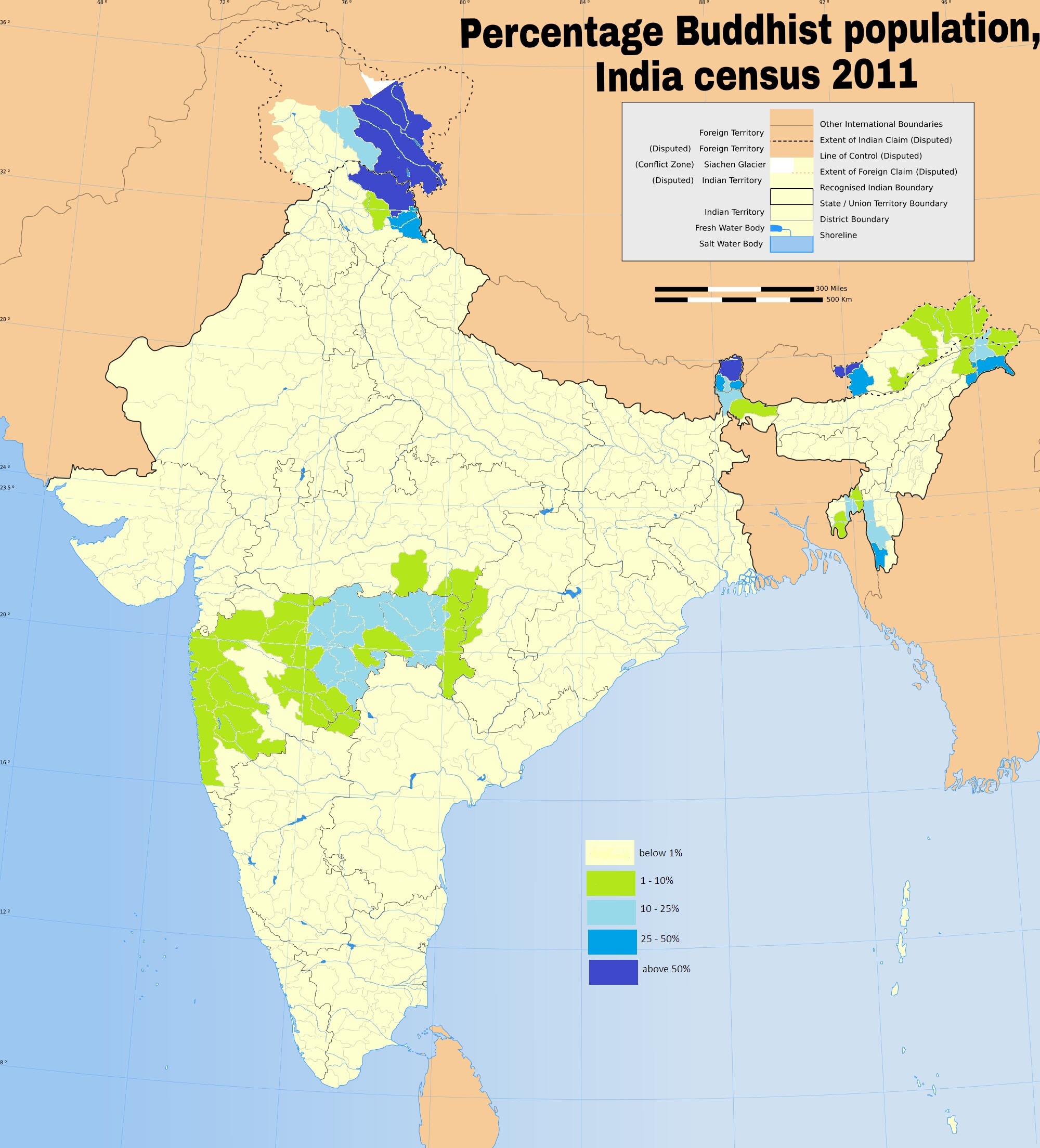
Distribution of Buddhism in India by district, 2011 census

Composition of Indian Buddhist, 2011 census
1. Scheduled Castes 5,757,576 (68.2%)
2. Scheduled Tribes 866,029 (10.3%)
3. OBCs and General 1,819,367 (21.5%)

The Buddhist revival remains concentrated in two states: Ambedkar's native Maharashtra, and Uttar Pradesh – the land of Bodhanand Mahastavir, Acharya Medharthi and their associates.

=== Developments in Uttar Pradesh ===
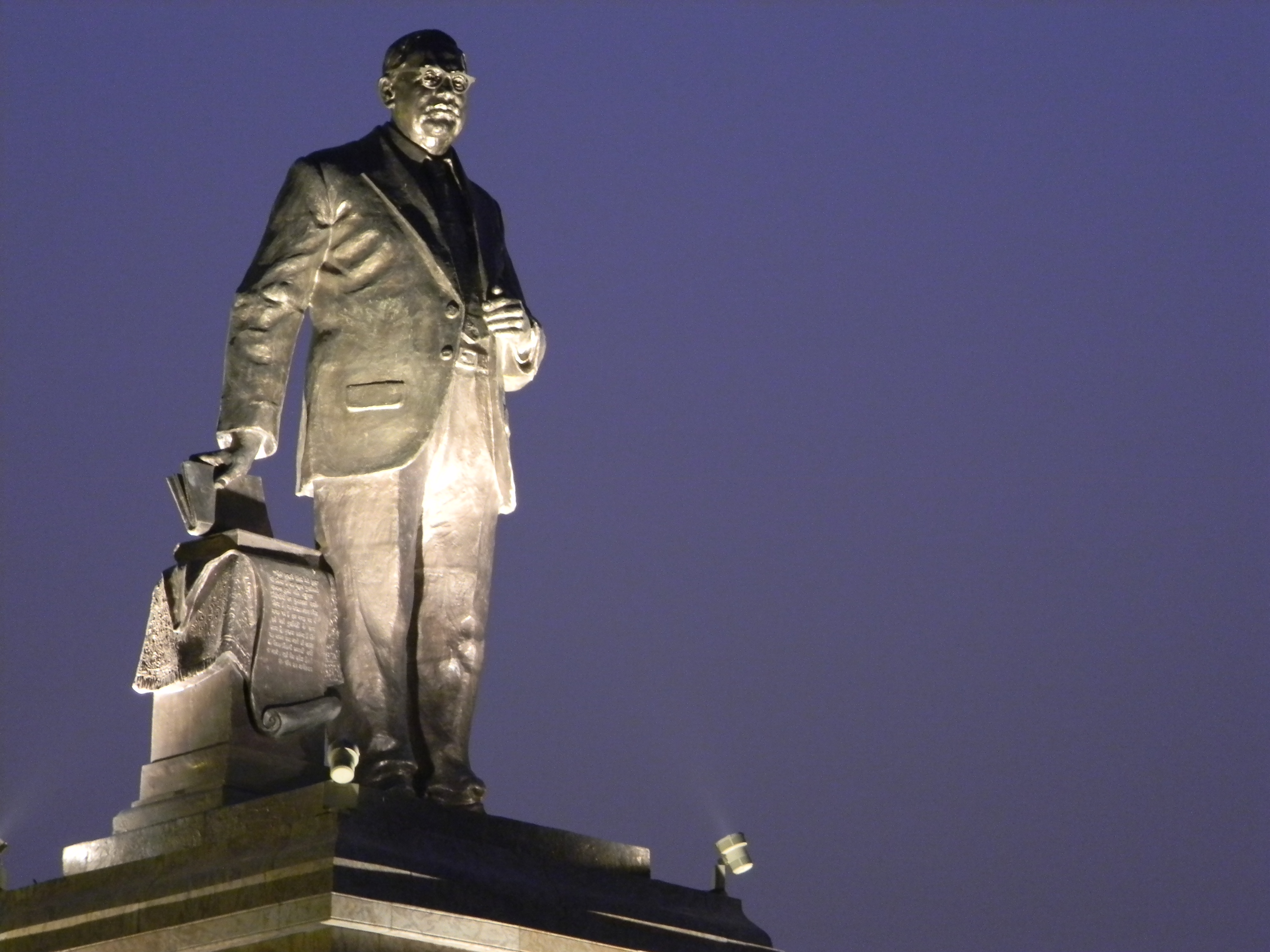
Statue of B.R.Ambedkar inside Ambedkar Park, Lucknow

Acharya Medharthi retired from his Buddhapuri school in 1960, and shifted to an ashram in Haridwar. He turned to the Arya Samaj and conducted Vedic yajnas all over India. After his death, he was cremated according to Arya Samaj rites. His Buddhpuri school became embroiled in property disputes. His follower, Bhoj Dev Mudit, converted to Buddhism in 1968 and set up a school of his own.

Rajendranath Aherwar appeared as an important Dalit leader in Kanpur. He joined the Republican Party of India and converted to Buddhism along with his whole family in 1961. In 1967, he founded the Kanpur branch of "Bharatiya Buddh Mahasabha". He held regular meetings where he preached Buddhism, officiated at Buddhist weddings and life cycle ceremonies, and organised festivals on Ambedkar's Jayanti (birth day), Sambuddhatva jayanthi, Diksha Divas (the day Ambedkar converted), and Ambedkar Paranirvan Divas (the day Ambedkar died).

The Dalit Buddhist movement in Kanpur gained impetus with the arrival of Dipankar, a Chamar bhikkhu, in 1980. Dipankar had come to Kanpur on a Buddhist mission and his first public appearance was scheduled at a mass conversion drive in 1981. The event was organised by Rahulan Ambawadekar, an RPI Dalit leader. In April 1981, Ambawadekar founded the Dalit Panthers (U.P. Branch) inspired by the Maharashtrian Dalit Panthers. The event met with severe criticism and opposition from Vishva Hindu Parishad and was banned.

The number of Buddhists in the Lucknow district increased from 73 in 1951 to 4327 in 2001. According to the 2001 census, almost 70% of the Buddhist population in Uttar Pradesh is from the scheduled castes background.

In 2002, Kanshi Ram, a popular political leader from a Sikh religious background, announced his intention to convert to Buddhism on 14 October 2006, the fiftieth anniversary of Ambedkar's conversion. He intended for 20,000,000 of his supporters to convert at the same time. Part of the significance of this plan was that Ram's followers include not only Untouchables, but persons from a variety of castes, who could significantly broaden Buddhism's support. But, he died 9 October 2006 after a lengthy illness; he was cremated as per Buddhist tradition.

Another popular Dalit leader, Uttar Pradesh Chief Minister and Bahujan Samaj Party leader Mayawati, has said that she and her followers will embrace Buddhism after the BSP forms a government at the centre.

=== Maharashtra ===
Flag symbolises Dalit movement in India.

Japanese-born Surai Sasai emerged as an important Buddhist leader in India. Sasai came to India in 1966 and met Nichidatsu Fujii, whom he helped with the Peace Pagoda at Rajgir. He fell out with Fuji, however, and started home, but, by his own account, was stopped by a dream in which a figure resembling Nagarjuna appeared and said, "Go to Nagpur". In Nagpur, he met Wamanrao Godbole, the person who had organised the conversion ceremony for Ambedkar in 1956. Sasai claims that when he saw a photograph of Ambedkar at Godbole's home, he realised that it was Ambedkar who had appeared in his dream. At first, Nagpur folk considered Surai Sasai very strange. Then he began to greet them with "Jai Bhim" (victory to Ambedkar) and to build viharas. In 1987 a court case to deport him on the grounds that he had overstayed his visa was dismissed, and he was granted Indian citizenship. Sasai and Bhante Anand Agra are two of main leaders of the campaign to free the Mahabodhi Temple at Bodh Gaya from Hindu control.

A movement originating in Maharashtra but also active in Uttar Pradesh, and spread out over quite a few other pockets where Neo Buddhists live, is Triratna Bauddha Mahāsaṅgha (formerly called TBMSG for Trailokya Bauddha Mahasangha Sahayaka Gana). It is the Indian wing of the UK-based Triratna Buddhist Community founded by Sangharakshita. Its roots lie in the scattered contacts that Sangharakshita had in the 1950s with Ambedkar. Sangharakshita, then still a bhikshu, participated in the conversion movement from 1956 until his departure to the UK in 1963.

When his new ecumenical movement had gained enough ground in the West, Sangharakshita worked with Ambedkarites in India and the UK to develop Indian Buddhism further. After visits in the late 1970s by Dharmachari Lokamitra from UK, supporters developed a two-pronged approach: social work through the Bahujan Hitaj (also spelled as Bahujan Hitay) trust, mainly sponsored from the general public by the British Buddhist-inspired Karuna Trust (UK), and direct Dharma work. Currently the movement has viharas and groups in at least 20 major areas, a couple of retreat centres, and hundreds of Indian Dharmacharis and Dharmacharinis.

Funding for movement's social and dharma work has come from foreign countries, including the Western countries and Taiwan. Some of the foreign-funded organisations include Trailokya Bauddha Mahasangha Sahayaka Gana and Triratna (Europe and India). Triratna has links with the 'Ambedkarite' Buddhist Romanis in Hungary.

=== Organised mass conversions ===
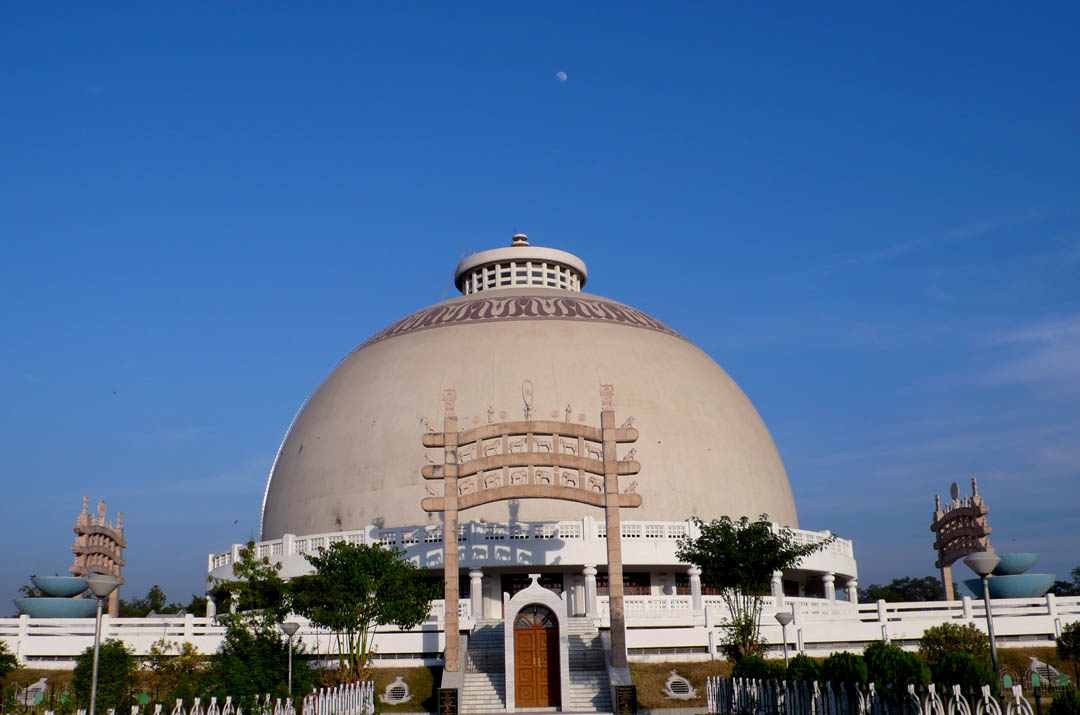
Deekshabhoomi Stupa in Nagpur, where Ambedkar converted to Buddhism

Since Ambedkar's conversion, several thousand people from different castes have converted to Buddhism in ceremonies including the twenty-two vows.

1957
In 1957, Mahastvir Bodhanand's Sri Lankan successor, Bhante Pragyanand, held a mass conversion drive for 15,000 people in Lucknow.

2001
A prominent Indian Navayana Buddhist leader and political activist, Udit Raj, organised a large mass conversion on 4 November 2001, where he gave the 22 vows, but the event met with active opposition from the government.

2006, Hyderabad
A report from the UK daily The Guardian said that some Hindus have converted to Buddhism. Buddhist monks from the UK and the U.S. attended the conversion ceremonies in India. Lalit Kumar, who works for a Hindu nationalist welfare association in Andhra Pradesh, asserted that Dalits should concentrate on trying to reduce illiteracy and poverty rather than looking for new religions.

2006, Gulbarga
On 14 October 2006, hundreds of people converted from Hinduism to Buddhism in Gulburga (Karnataka).

2006
At 50th anniversary celebrations in 2006 of Ambedkar's deeksha. Non-partisan sources put the number of attendees (not converts) at 30,000. The move was criticised by Hindu groups as "unhelpful" and has been criticised as a "political stunt."

2007, Mumbai
On 27 May 2007, tens of thousands of Dalits from Maharashtra gathered at the Mahalakshmi racecourse in Mumbai to mark the 50th anniversary of the conversion of Ambedkar. The number of people who converted versus the number of people in attendance was not clear. The event was organised by the Republican Party of India leader Ramdas Athvale.

2018, Nagpur
During 6–8 October 2019 more than 55,000 Dalits converted to Buddhism in Nagpur, Maharashtra.

2018, Meerut

On 24 October 2018 about 1,500 people converted to Buddhism following an event organised in Swami Vivekanand Subharti University, Meerut.
2019, Ahmedabad

On 27 October 2019 about 1,500 Dalits embraced Buddhism in an event organized in Sardar Vallabhahai Patel National Memorial. The mass conversion was organized by the Buddha’s Light International Association (BLIA) founded by Ven. Hsing Yun in 1992. The BLIA is associated with Fo Guang Shan, the largest Buddhist organization in Taiwan, also founded by Ven. Hsing Yun.
2022, Delhi

On October 5, 2022 about 10,000 Hindus converted to Buddhism in Ambedkar Bhawan, Jhandewalan, New Delhi.

2023, Porbandar

On 14 April 2023 almost 50,000 people belonging to Dalit and tribal category embraced Buddhism in Porbandar, Gujarat.
2023, Junagarh

On 21 May 2023 more than 500 persons from 75 dalit families converted from Hinduism and embraced Buddhism in Junagarh, Gujarat. The converts pledged allegiance to Gautam Buddha's Panchsheel principles.
2025, Surat

On 14 May 2025 about 80 Dalit families converted to Buddhism following an event in Anand Buddha Vihar, Amroli, Surat, Gujarat.

2025, Ahmedabad

On 02 October, 2025 not more than 120 dalits converted to Buddhism following an event in Kankaria, Ahmedabad, Gujarat. The reasons for conversion include caste-based discrimination, denied entry in Hindu temples, and influence of Ambedkar's conversion in the same time frame in 1956.

=== Critique ===
Prerna Singh Bindra argued a mass-conversion of Hindus to Ambedkarite Buddhism under Udit Raj to be a political stunt.

== Distinctive interpretation ==
According to Gail Omvedt, an American-born and naturalised Indian sociologist and human rights activist:

Ambedkar's Buddhism seemingly differs from that of those who accepted by faith, who 'go for refuge' and accept the canon. This much is clear from its basis: it does not accept in totality the scriptures of the Theravada, the Mahayana, or the Vajrayana. The question that is then clearly put forth: is a fourth yana, a Navayana, a kind of modernistic Enlightenment version of the Dhamma really possible within the framework of Buddhism?

According to Omvedt, Ambedkar and his Buddhist movement deny many of the core doctrines of Buddhism. All the elements of religious modernism, state Christopher Queen and Sallie King, may be found in Ambedkar Buddhism where his The Buddha and His Dhamma abandons the traditional precepts and practices, then adopts science, activism and social reforms as a form of Engaged Buddhism. Ambedkar's formulation of Buddhism is different from Western modernism, states Skaria, given his synthesis of the ideas of modern Karl Marx into the structure of ideas by the ancient Buddha.

== Criticism of the movement ==
Critics have argued that Neo-Buddhism does not have a strong influence, especially after the death of Ambedkar.

Some critics also argue that Neo-Buddhism deviates too much from traditional Buddhism. Even though traditional Buddhism emphasizes equality among people, it does not deny the caste system. In addition, its emphasis on people's liberation in the religious sense does not deny social distinctions as the norm of organizations in society, as the Buddha himself was the founder of a monastic order. A number of critics also argue that there is no moral foundation for the political practices that are based on Neo-Buddhist notions, since religion is totally voluntary, and Neo-Buddhism may thus violate democratic principles by restricting its followers to abide to certain non-religious rules.

=== Navayana as a political movement ===
The mass conversions to Buddhism are also seen as a political stunt rather than a genuine spiritual movement. Politicians such as Udit Raj, Ramdas Athawale, Kanshi Ram and Mayawati have also been involved in staging or planning to stage mass conversions—these politicians are members of either the Bahujan Samaj Party or the Republican Party of India.

According to Janet Contursi, Ambedkar reinterprets Buddhist religion and with Navayana "speaks through Gautama and politicizes the Buddha philosophy as he theologizes his own political views".

=== Ambedkar's reinterpretations ===
Ambedkar not only rejected Hinduism but also the most popular Buddhist schools. According to certain interpretations on Ambedkar's views, he considered all ideas in Theravada, Vajrayana and Mahayana Buddhism that relate to an individual's merit and spiritual development as insertions into Buddhism, and something that "cannot be accepted to be the word of the Buddha". Buddhism, to Ambedkar, must have been a social reform movement. Ambedkar's radical reinterpretations of the faith reinterpreted many of the main tenets of mainstream Buddhism such as renunciation, meditation, Samsara, Karma, reincarnation and even the Four Noble Truths. Although none of the concepts are rejected, the extent of the reinterpretation means many mainstream Buddhist sources claim it to be rejection of the core tenets of Buddhism.

Ambedkar reinterprets the traditional story of The Buddha and the Great Renunciation in order to try and gain mass appeal from Dalits by giving the impression that The Buddha founded Buddhism as a social reform movement rather than a spiritual movement. Virginia Hancock writes about Ambedkar's reinterpretations as turning the Buddha into a politician.

According to Ambedkar, the Buddha advocated a rational and peaceful resolution of an inter-tribe water conflict but was unable to gain the necessary political leverage because he lacked majority vote. He then went into exile and became a renunciant because it was the only way to prevent his tribe from going to war with their neighbors. Ambedkar omits any mention of old age, sickness, and death (the forms of suffering the Buddha is usually understood to have encountered). In this way the Buddha’s renunciation is motivated more by political exigencies rather than a desire to find the ultimate truth, and he becomes a figure not unlike a minority politician in contemporary India. The discussion of water rights was also a familiar topic after the Mahad Satyagraha. These changes, though unorthodox, create a character for the Buddha that might be easily understood by oppressed communities, specifically Dalits.

Scholars broadly accept that the depictions of the Buddha as a social reformer are inaccurate. (Note: It has been long recognized that Buddhism and Jainism were not movements for social reform, and that the Buddha's doctrine did not aim at transformation or improvement of the social conditions.) Gombrich (2012), states that there is no evidence that the Buddha began or pursued social reforms, rather his aim was at the salvation of those who joined his monastic order. Modernist interpreters of Buddhism, states Gombrich, keep picking up this "mistake from western authors", a view that initially came into vogue during the colonial era.

Richard Gombrich adds that Buddha should not be seen as a social reformer: "his concern was to reform individuals and help them leave society forever, not to reform the world... He never preached against social inequality, only declared its irrelevance to salvation. He never tried to abolish the caste system nor to do away with slavery"

Empirical evidence outside of India, such as in the Theravada Buddhist monasteries of the Sinhalese society, suggests that class ideas have been prevalent among the sangha monks, and between the Buddhist monks and the laity. In all canonical Buddhist texts, the khattiyas (warrior class) are always mentioned first and never other classes such as brahmans, vessas, suddas.

== See also ==
- Bhadant Anand Kausalyayan
- The Buddha and His Dhamma
- Buddhism in India
- Buddhism in Nepal
- Buddhism in Sri Lanka
- Buddhist modernism
- Buddhist Society of India
- Chaitya Bhoomi
- Humanistic Buddhism
- Lord Buddha TV
- Marathi Buddhists
- Namantar Andolan
- New religious movement
- Bhadant Nagarjun Arya Surai Sasai

== Bibliography ==
- Adele Fiske (1969). "Religion and Buddhism among India's New Buddhists". Social Research. 36 (1): 123–157.
- Surendra Jondhale; Johannes Beltz, eds. (2004). Reconstructing the World: B.R. Ambedkar and Buddhism in India. Oxford University Press. ISBN 978-0-19-566529-1.
- Trevor Ling; Steven Axelrod (1980). Buddhist Revival in India: Aspects of the Sociology of Buddhism. Palgrave Macmillan UK. ISBN 978-1-349-16310-6.
- Omvedt, Gail (2003). Buddhism in India: Challenging Brahmanism and Caste (3rd ed.). SAGE. ISBN 978-81-321-0370-7.
- Christopher S. Queen (2015). "Socially Engaged Buddhism: Emerging patterns in Theory and Practice". In Steven M. Emmanuel (ed.). A Companion to Buddhist Philosophy. Wiley-Blackwell. pp. 524–535. ISBN 978-1-119-14466-3.
