= Buddhism in Maharashtra =

Buddhism in Maharashtra may refer to:

- Marathi Buddhists
- Navayana
