= Lord Buddha TV =

Indian broadcasting channel

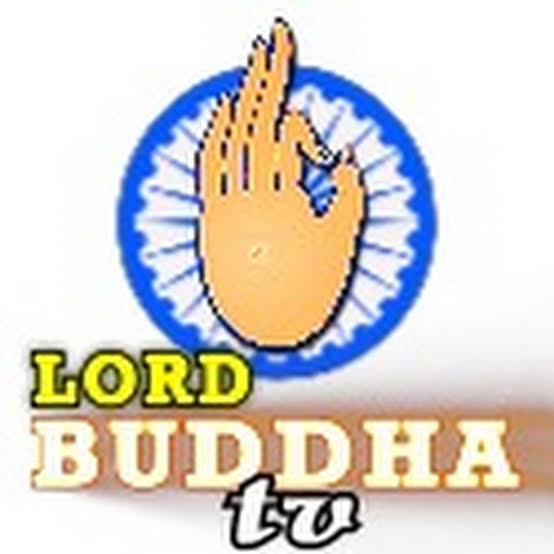
- Country: India
- Broadcast area: Pan India
- Network: Broadcast television and online
- Headquarters: Nagpur

Programming
- Languages: Hindi and Marathi
- Picture format: 4:3 (576i, SDTV)

Ownership
- Owner: Sachin Moon

History
- Launched: 26 November 2010; 14 years ago

Links
- Website: youtube.com/@lordbuddhatelevision/

Lord Buddha TV is an Indian 24×7 Hindi and Marathi mainstream Ambedkarite and Navayana Buddhist channel. It is headquartered in Nagpur, Maharashtra. In June 2018, its viewership was 25 million. It broadcasts daily programmes and documentaries on Buddha's teachings and his Dhamma. The Lord Buddha TV is available on more than 800 cable operators, DTH platforms as well as online.

== History ==
Lord Buddha TV was launched on 26 November 2010 by Sachin Moon, Bhayaji Khairkar and Raju Moon. Lord Buddha TV is a GEC channel with stated purpose of developing understanding and acceptance of the philosophy and the teachings of Gautam Buddha and Babasaheb Ambedkar. The viewership is all across India and in other countries which follow the ideology of the Buddha.
