= Sasai =

Sasai is a Japanese surname. Notable people with the surname include:

- Junichi Sasai (1918–1942), Japanese naval aviator and fighter ace
- Ryuji Sasai, Japanese video game composer and bassist
- Surai Sasai, Japanese-born Buddhist bhikkhu (monk)
- Yoshiki Sasai, Japanese stem cell biologist
