= Sheo Dan Mal =

Indian architect (1923–2007)

Sheodanmal Mokha
- Born: 5 August 1923; Phalodi, Jodhpur State, British India
- Died: 24 January 2007 (aged 83); Nagpur, Maharashtra, India
- Occupation: Architect
- Buildings: Deekshabhoomi, Yashwant Stadium, Nagpur; Panchasheel Theatre etc.

Sheodanmal Mokha (5 August 1923 – 24 January 2007) was an Indian architect. He is known for designing B. R. Ambedkar's memorial at Deekshabhoomi in Nagpur.

== Early life ==
Sheodanmal Mokha was born in Phalodi, a city and a municipality in Jodhpur district, Rajasthan on 5 August 1923. He studied architecture at All India Council for Technical Education, and completed his diploma. He became an Associate Member of the Institution of Engineer (AMIE) in 1954.

== Career ==
After serving in many post, he went to the Indian city of Nagpur in 1956. In Nagpur the first building he designed was the Panchasheel cinema theatre, later it became a landmark. He also designed the Guru Nanak Bhawan auditorium of the University of Nagpur, the buildings of the local branches of Indian Medical Association and the Institution of Engineers, the Town Hall of Nagpur Municipal Corporation, Yeshwant Stadium, and the sprawling market yard of Nagpur Agriculture Produce Marketing Committee (APMC). He designed many complexes in Indian cities such as Indore, Hyderabad, Chennai, Bangalore, Kolkata, etc. His most notable architectural achievement is the design of the Buddhist Stupa named Deekshabhoomi. Sheo Dan Mal took inspiration of the historic Sanchi Stupa, while designing the Deekshabhoomi. The stupa, constructed under the guidance of the Ambedkar Smarak Samiti and was inaugurated by then President, K. R. Narayanan.

== Legacy ==
He died on 24 January 2007 in Nagpur.

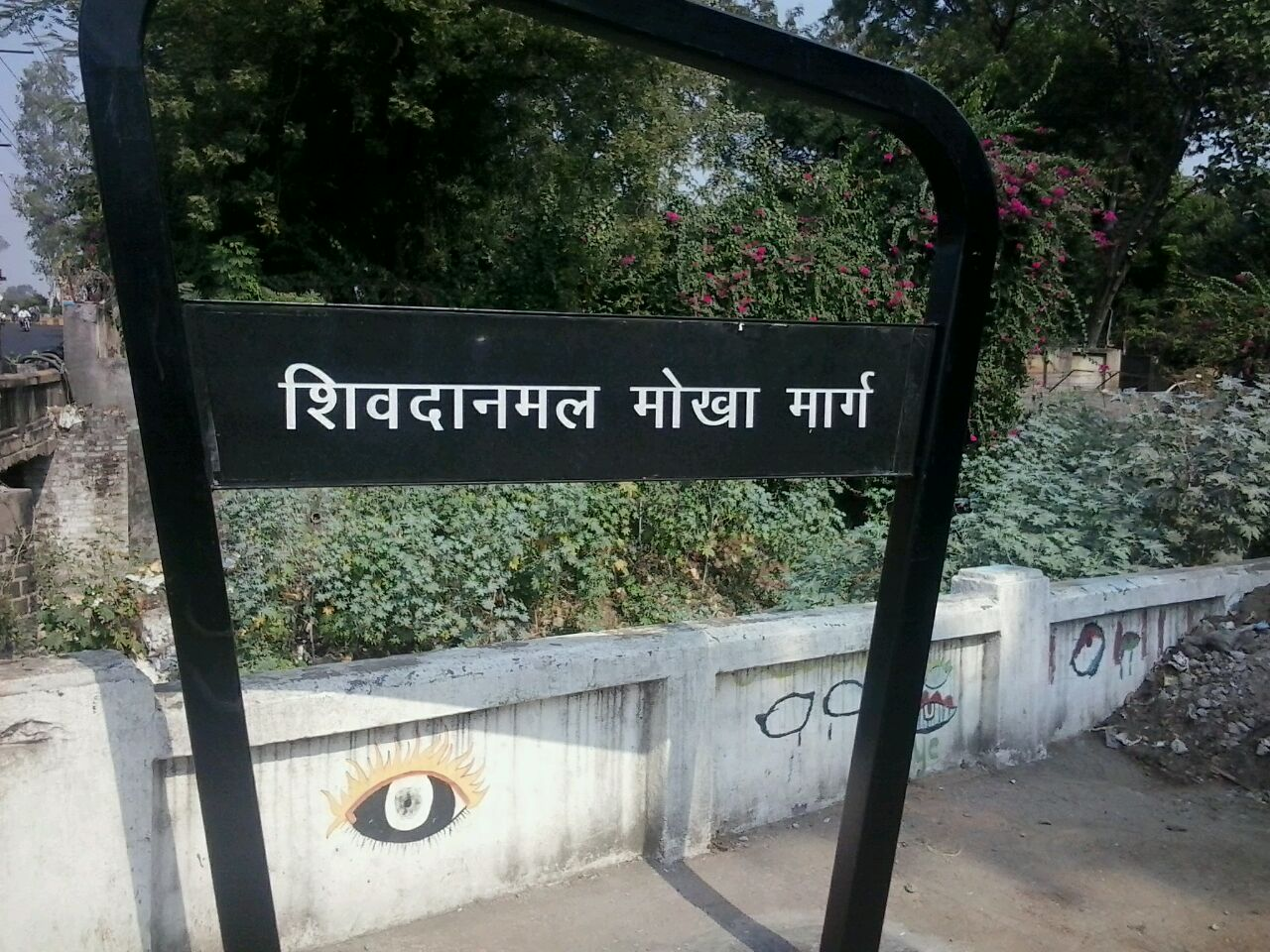
Sheo Dan Mal Street

The Nagpur Municipal Corporation (NMC) honored the legacy of Sheo Dan Mal, by naming a road after him. The road stretches from Panchsheel Talkies Square to VIP Road in Nagpur. This gesture was officially marked by a ceremony, which was inaugurated by Nitin Gadkari, then, the national president of the Bharatiya Janata Party (BJP) and currently cabinet minister. The naming recognizes Sheo Dan Mal's substantial contribution to the city's architectural heritage.
