= Surai Sasai =

Indian Buddhist monk (born 1935)

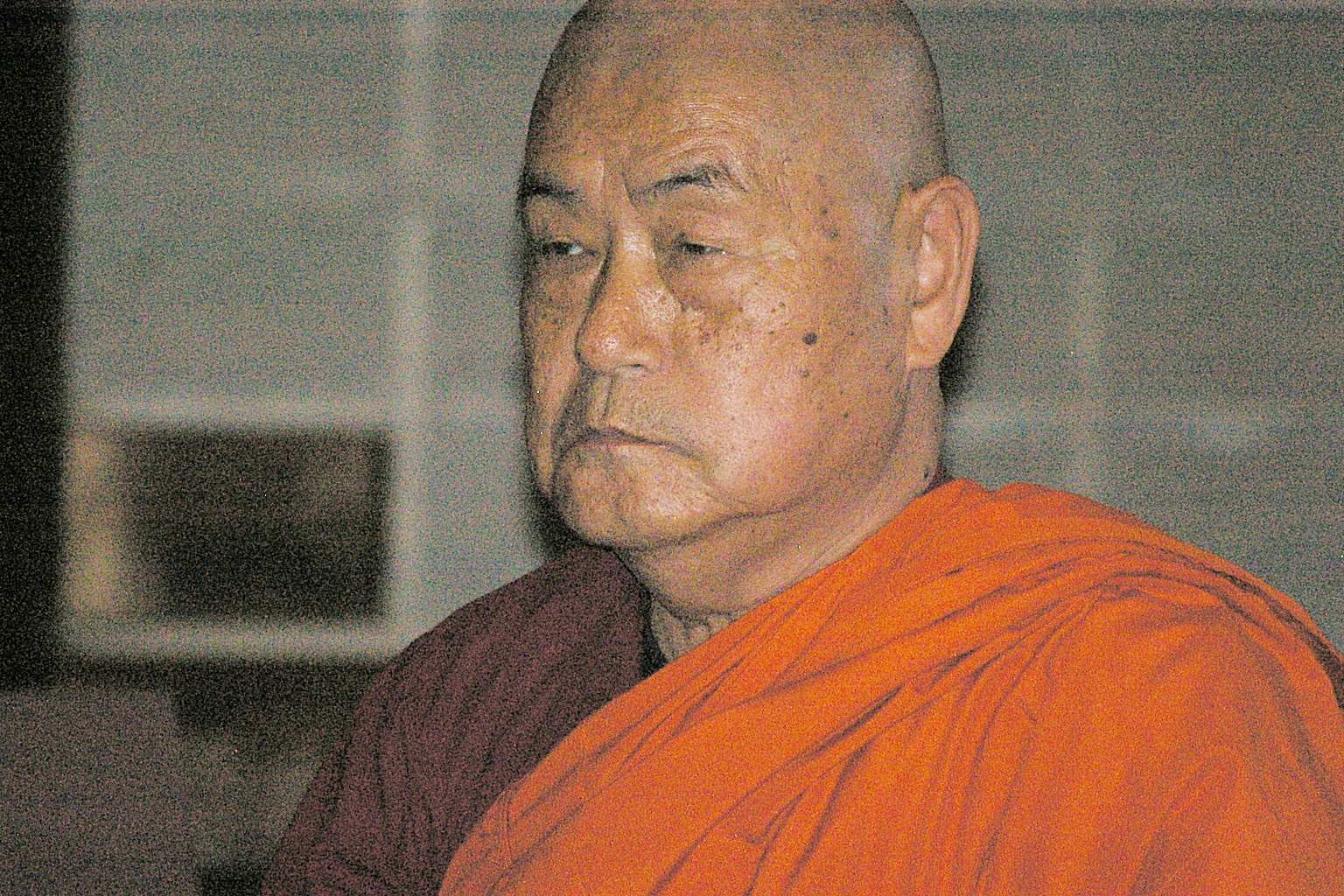
- Surai Sasai, 2009

Personal life
- Born: 30 August 1935 (age 90) Sugao (Niimi), Okayama Prefecture, Japan
- Education: Taisho University, Tokyo
- Other names: Sasai, Shūrei, Bhadant Nagarjuna Arya Surai Sasai, Bhadant Sasai, Minoru Sasai, Tenjit Surai

Religious life
- Religion: Buddhism
- School: Shingon and Navayana
- Dharma name: Bhadant Nagarjun Surai Sasai

Senior posting
- Teacher: Shujuma Yamamoto, Nichidatsu Fujii
- Based in: Nagpur
- Students: Bhante Bodhi Dhamma, Bhikkhu AbhayaPutra or Phra Anand Lanjewar

Bhadant Nagarjun Arya Surai Sasai (佐々井 秀嶺, Sasai Shūrei; born Minoru Sasai (佐々井 実, Sasai Minoru)), popularly known as Sasai, is an Indian Buddhist monk from Japan who later chose India as his home. He is the president of the Dr. Babasaheb Ambedkar Memorial committee Deekshabhoomi.

== Early years ==
Surai Sasai was born in Niimi, Okayama Prefecture, with the lay name Minoru Sasai on 30 August 1935. He took tonsure as a novice monk at the age of 14 and was given the ordination name Tenjit Surai, "Light of the Sun, beautiful Mountain Peak", by his Tendai teacher Shujuma Yamamoto. In 1955 he joined the monastic order of the Shingon school and in 1966 he travelled to Thailand to study vipassana.

== Spreading Buddhism in India ==
Sasai came to India in 1966 and met Nichidatsu Fujii, whom he helped with the building of a peace pagoda at Rajgir. He fell out with Fuji, however, but he related that on his return journey he was stopped by a vision of a figure resembling Nagarjuna who said, "Go to Nagpur". In Nagpur, he met Wamanrao Godbole, the person who had organized the conversion ceremony for B. R. Ambedkar in 1956. Sasai claims that when he saw a photograph of B. R. Ambedkar at Godbole's home, he realized that Ambedkar had appeared in his dream. At first, Nagpur residents considered Surai Sasai very strange, but he became popular after he began to greet them with "Jai Bhim" (victory to Ambedkar) and to build viharas.

In 1987, Sasai was arrested for overstaying his visum but his followers protested against his planned deportation. A court case to deport him was dismissed and he was granted Indian citizenship, which cost him his Japanese citizenship.

Sasai is one of the main leaders of the campaign to free the Mahabodhi Temple at Bodh Gaya from Hindu control. As the president of the Bodhisatva Nagarjun Smarak Samstha Va Anusandhan Kendra he supported the excavations at Mansar. Sasai represented the Buddhists as a member of the National Commission for Minorities from 2003 to 2006. Arya Bhadant Surai Sasai is the president of the Dr. Babasaheb Ambedkar Smarak Samiti Deekshabhoomi (Dr. Babasaheb Ambedkar Memorial committee Deekshabhoomi), Nagpur.

== Disciples ==
Sasai has hundreds of thousands of lay followers and hundreds of ordained monk and novice disciples. His most active disciples are Bhante Bodhi Dhamma (Dhammaji), Prajnasheela Bhikkhu, Ken Bodhi, and Bhikkhu Abhaya Putra. The first and last were trained as Theravada monk and the others as Mahayana monks. Bodhi Dhamma works in South India teaching Zen while Prajnasheela works in central India. Abhaya Putra is the founder of Metta India and trains Theravadin monks and novices of Indian origin in Thailand

== See also ==
- Buddhism in India
- Buddhist modernism
- Dalit Buddhist movement
- Navayana

== Sources ==
- Doyle, Tara N. (2003). Liberate the Mahabodhi Temple! Socially Engaged Buddhism, Dalit-Style. In: Steven Heine, Charles Prebish (eds), Buddhism in the Modern World. Oxford University Press. pp. 249–280. ISBN 0-19-514698-0.
- Enoki, Miki (2010). "Role and Network of Buddhist Institution in Bijapur, Karnataka ~ Renaissance of Indian Buddhism". Voices for Equity Minority and Majority in South Asia (PDF). RINDAS International Symposium Series 1. The Center for the Study of Contemporary India, Ryukoku University. pp. 28–44.
- Geary, David (2017). The Rebirth of Bodh Gaya: Buddhism and the Making of a World Heritage Site. University of Washington Press. ISBN 978-0-295-74238-0.
- Joshi, Jagadpati; Sharma, A.K. (2005). "Mansar Excavations 1998-2004: The Discovery of Pravarapur" (PDF). Puramanthana (3): 1–26. Archived from the original (PDF) on 5 January 2012.
- Karlsson, Hans (12 August 2015). "Surai Sasai: a Buddhist monk battling the caste dragon". The Japan Times. Archived from the original on 15 August 2015.
- Kinnard, Jacob N. (2014), Places in Motion: The Fluid Identities of Temples, Images, and Pilgrims. Oxford University Press, p. 138
- Knopf, Rainer (2000). "Bodh-Gaya: Ein internationales Zentrum des Buddhismus in nicht-buddhistischer Umgebung". Internationales Asienforum. 31 (3–4): 289–314.
- METTA (12 May 2012), Meditation Education Training Treatment Academy Organization, Meditation Education Training Treatment Academy Organization, archived from the original on 23 February 2014
- National Commission for Minorities, Composition of Commission (2003-2006), archived from the original on 9 August 2011
- Nayse, Suhas (8 March 2020). "Vidarbha beat rest of maharashtra: Vidarbha emerge champions in state-level disabled cricket tournament". The Times of India.
- Quadir, Abdul (28 July 2013). "Mahabodhi temple serial blasts: NIA in a fix over Sasai's quizzing". The Times of India.
