= Deekshabhoomi =

Monument at Nagpur, Maharashtra, India

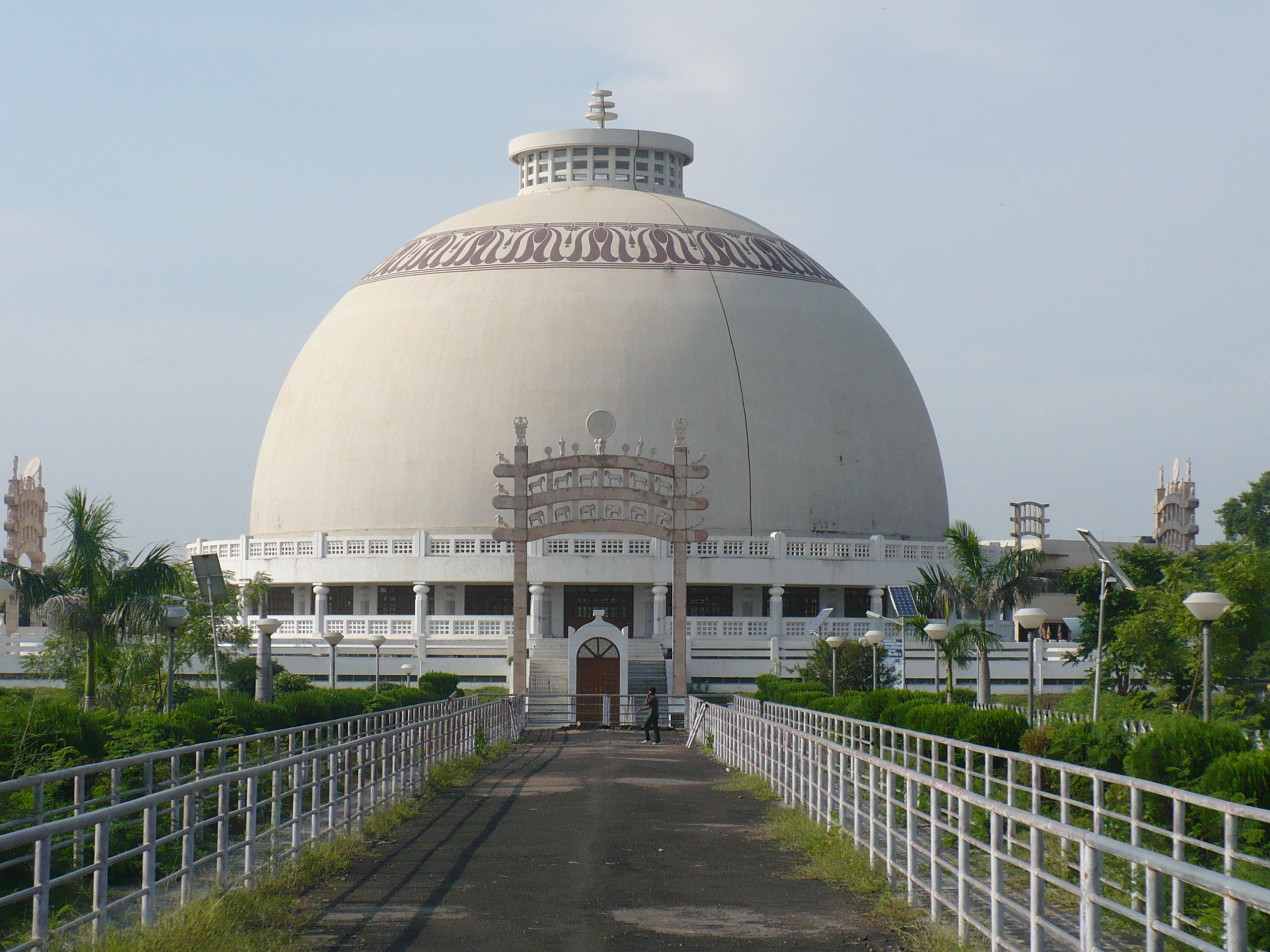
- Deekshabhoomi Stupa

General information
- Type: Religious and historical monument Spiritual
- Architectural style: Stupa
- Location: Nagpur, Maharashtra, India, South Ambazari Road, Abhyankar Nagar, Nagpur
- Coordinates: 21°7′41″N 79°4′1″E
- Construction started: July 1978
- Inaugurated: 18 December 2001

Design and construction
- Architects: Sheo Dan Mal, Shashi Sharma

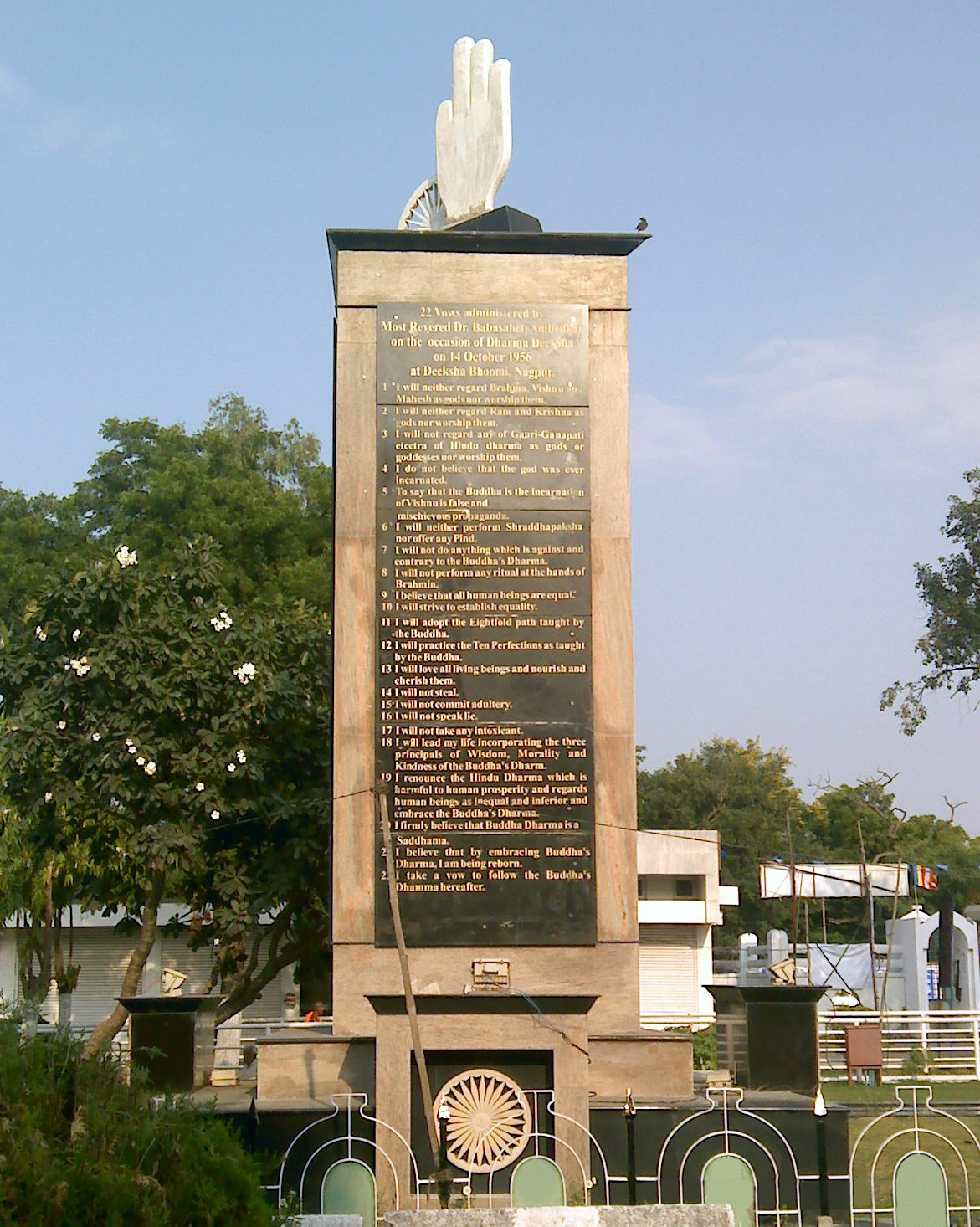
22 vows given by Ambedkar at Deekshabhoomi

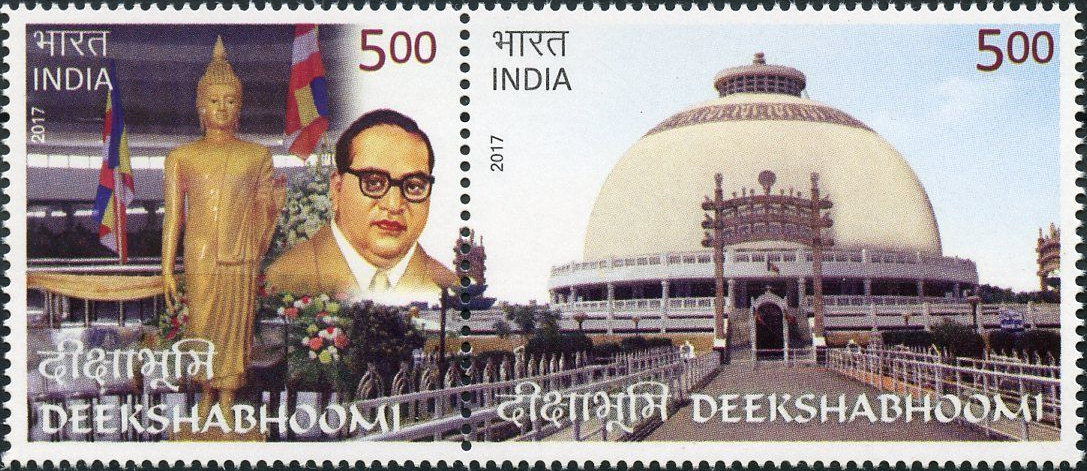
Ambedkar and Deekshabhoomi on a 2017 postage stamp of India

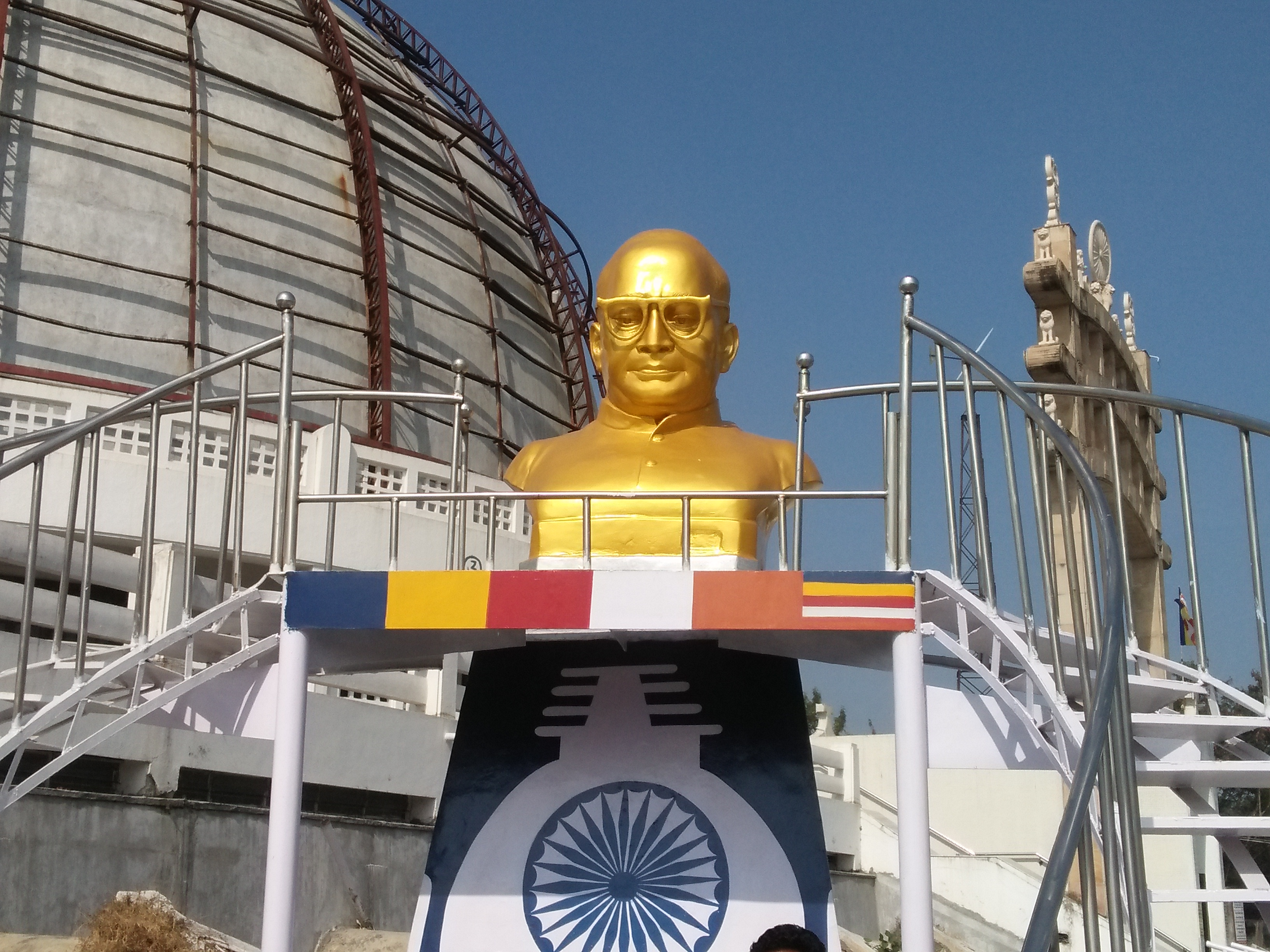
Bust of Babasaheb Ambedkar at Deekshabhoomi

Deekshabhoomi, also written as Deeksha Bhoomi, is a sacred monument of Navayana Buddhism located in Nagpur city in the state of Maharashtra in India; where Dr. Babasaheb Ambedkar with approximately 400,000 of his followers, mainly Dalits, embraced Buddhism on Ashoka Vijaya Dashami on 14 October 1956. Ambedkar played a significant role in the revival of Buddhism in India, and inspired many such mass conversions to Buddhism.

Deekshabhoomi is in Nagpur, Maharashtra, a location regarded as a sacred place, prernabhoomi (inspiring land) of social revolution being atheist and a preparations for social actions against class conflicts, discrimination, inequality also the first pilgrimage center of Ambedkarite Buddhism in India. Millions of pilgrims visit Deekshabhoomi every year, especially on Dhamma Chakra Pravartan Din i.e. Samrat Ashoka Vijaya Dashmi ("Mass Conversion Ceremony Day") and 14 October, the memorial day when B.R.Ambedkar embraced and converted to Buddhism here. His final religious act was to embrace Buddhism and envisioned making India The Buddhist nation a prabuddha Bharat

Deeksha literally means 'act of ordaining' and bhoomi means the 'ground'. Deekshabhoomi means the ground where people got ordained as Buddhist. This religious mass conversion at one place was the first ever of its kind in history. Deekshabhoomi is one of two places of considered to be of great importance in the life of Ambedkar, the other being Chaitya Bhoomi in Mumbai.

== History ==
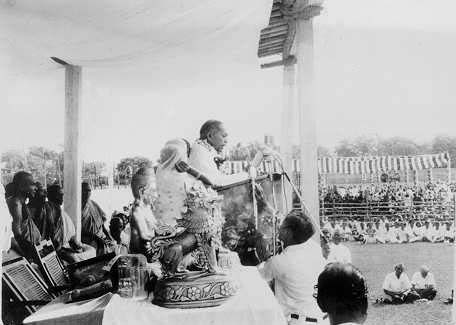
Ambedkar delivering speech during mass conversion in Deekshabhoomi, Nagpur, 14 October 1956.

Dr. Ambedkar had declared in 1935 that although he was born as a Hindu, he would not die as one, as conversion was the solution to abandon the caste system. After this declaration and having extensively and exhaustively studied the doctrines of all the major world religions, Dr. Ambedkar would choose Buddhism for himself and his followers.

Buddhism was 2,550 years old in 1956, so it was a notable year of celebration for the Buddhist religious world globally and 14 October was the traditional date of conversion of Emperor Ashoka, the 3rd Mauryan Monarch and the day is celebrated as Ashok Vijaya Dashmi. He selected Nagpur for his conversion ceremony, as he explained in his speech at that occasion, because Nagpur was the homeland of 'Nag' people who embraced Buddhism, supported it with great efforts in its early period, and propagated it throughout India. Ground near the Ramdaspeth area in Nagpur was selected for the ceremony.

On 14 October 1956, Dr. Ambedkar and his wife took the oath of Three Jewels and Five Precepts from the Burmese monk Mahasthavir Chandramani from Kushinagar. Dr. Ambedkar then gave the oath of Three Jewels, Five Precepts, and 22 Vows to thousands of his followers. In this way, Nagpur became the birthplace of Neo Buddhist movement.

Dr. Ambedkar died on 6 December 1956, one and a half months after the Deeksha ceremony. However, this ceremonial conversion continued after his death, converting 15-20 million by March 1959. After his death the 'Dr. Babasaheb Ambedkar Deekshabhoomi Smarak Samiti' (Dr. Babasaheb Ambedkar Deekshabhoomi Memorial committee) was organized for the management of Deekshabhoomi. The committee decided to build a stupa at the place as a monument of that ceremony and a mass conversion of people to Buddhism. Arya Bhadant Surai Sasai is the president of the Dr. Babasaheb Ambedkar Deekshabhoomi Memorial committee, Nagpur.

== Architecture ==
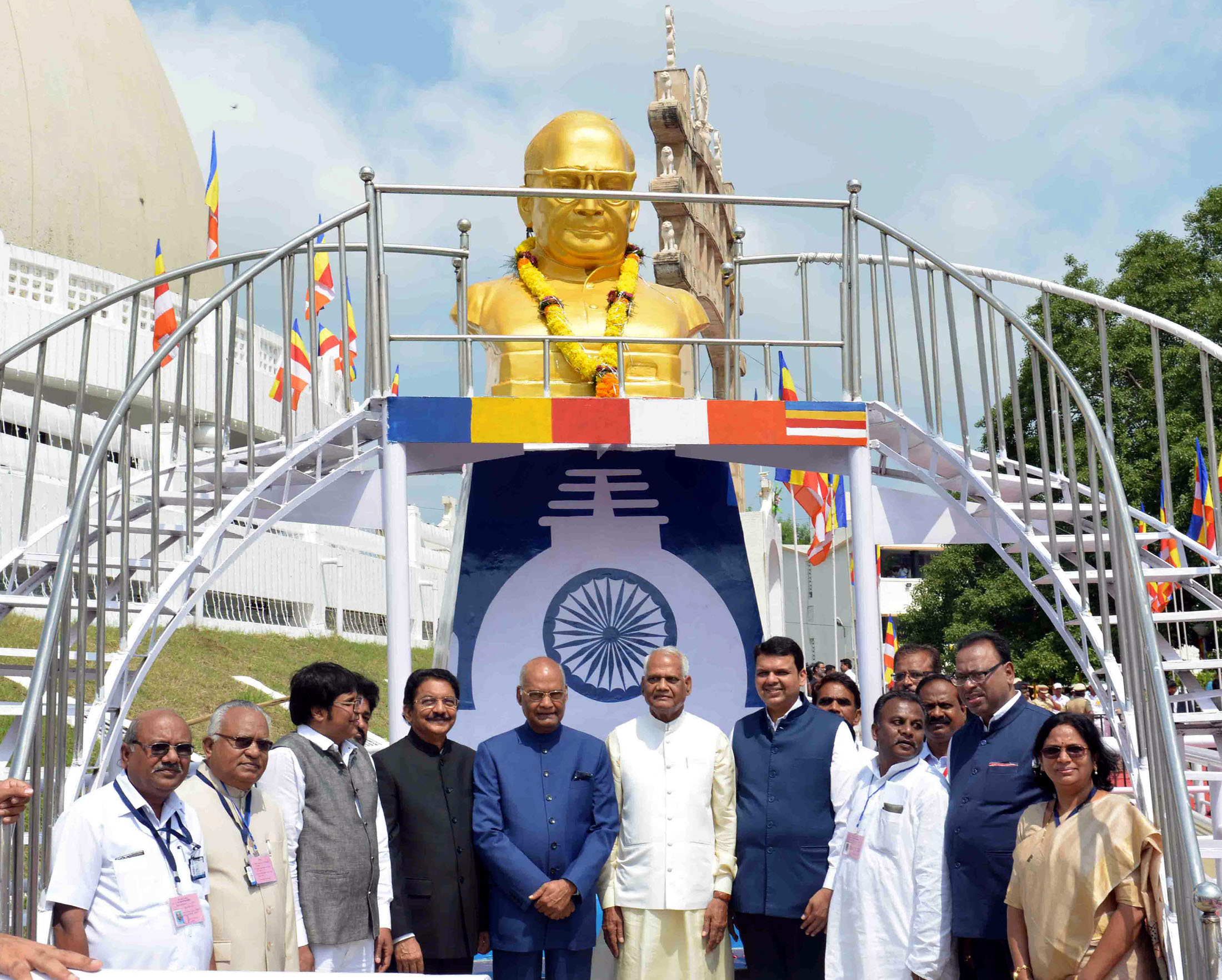
The President, Shri Ram Nath Kovind in a group photograph, during his visit to Deeksha Bhoomi, at Nagpur, in Maharashtra.

=== Construction ===
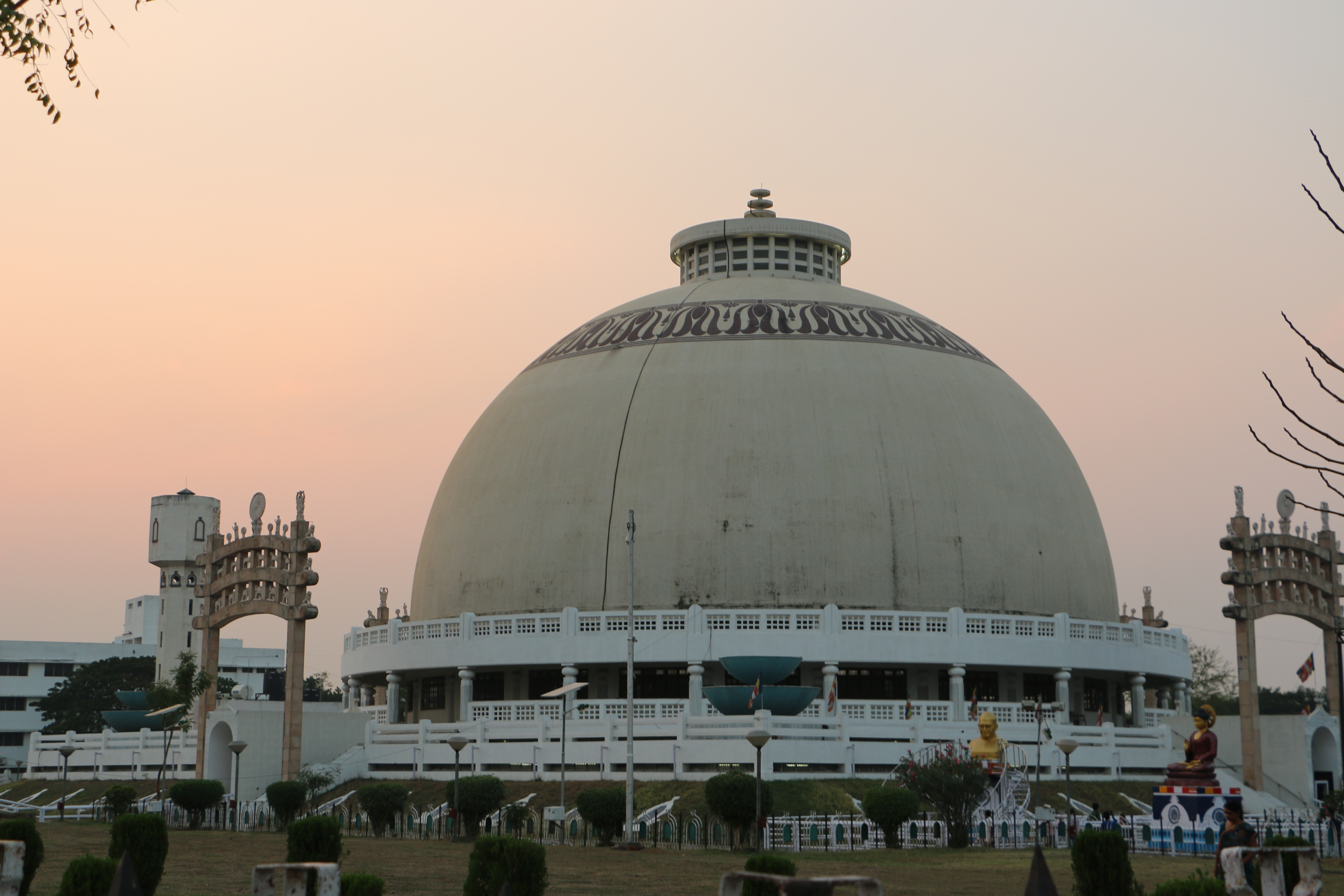
Deekshabhoomi

Deekshabhoomi is spread over four acres of significant land in the city. The stupa was designed by architect Sheo Dan Mal. In 1968, construction started with residential houses for monks, later on P/G College. Construction of the stupa started in July 1978, but it took a long time to finish. The stupa was inaugurated on 18 December 2001 by the President of India K. R. Narayanan.

=== Stupa ===
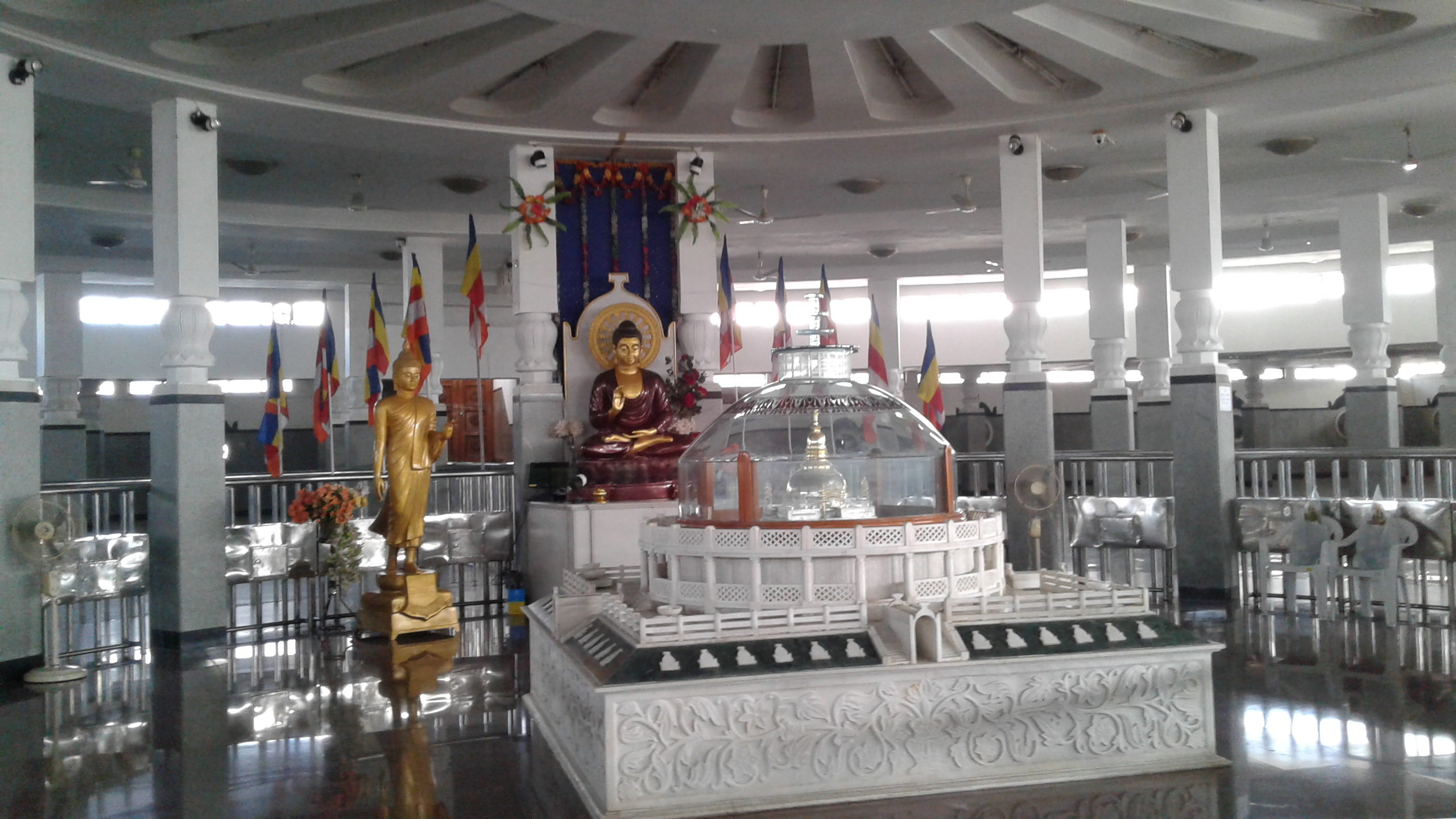
Inner side of Deeksha Bhoomi - Bodhisattva Dr. Babasaheb Ambedkar ashes urn (in glass) after cremation in front of the Buddha statue

It comprises a large two storied hemispherical buildings with gates resembling a Sanchi gate. Five thousand monks can stay in each storey. The design of the stupa at Deekshabhoomi is based on the architecture of the world famous stupa of Sanchi. But unlike the stupa of Sanchi, Deekshabhoomi stupa is completely hollow inside. It is the largest hollow stupa among all Buddhist stupas in the world. The inner circular hall is spread across 4000 square feet with granite, marble and Dholpur sandstone used in its construction.

On the ground floor, there is a 211 x 211 feet large square hall. At the center of this hall, an image of Buddha is placed. This image was donated to Deekshabhoomi by Thai students studying at Nagpur University. There is a library and a photo exhibition of the events in the lives of Gautama Buddha and Ambedkar.

Above the hall, there is a hollow dome. This dome is surrounded by a veranda. On all four sides, fountains are placed. Above the dome, there is a small slab and a little decorative umbrella. The stupa has doors facing four directions. The doors open in large arcs, which are decorated with Ashok Chakras, and statues of horses, elephants, and lions.

Around the stupa, there is a garden that is maintained by the Nagpur Improvement Trust. Statues of Ambedkar and images of Gautama Buddha are in front of the stupa.

=== Vihar and the Bodhi Tree ===
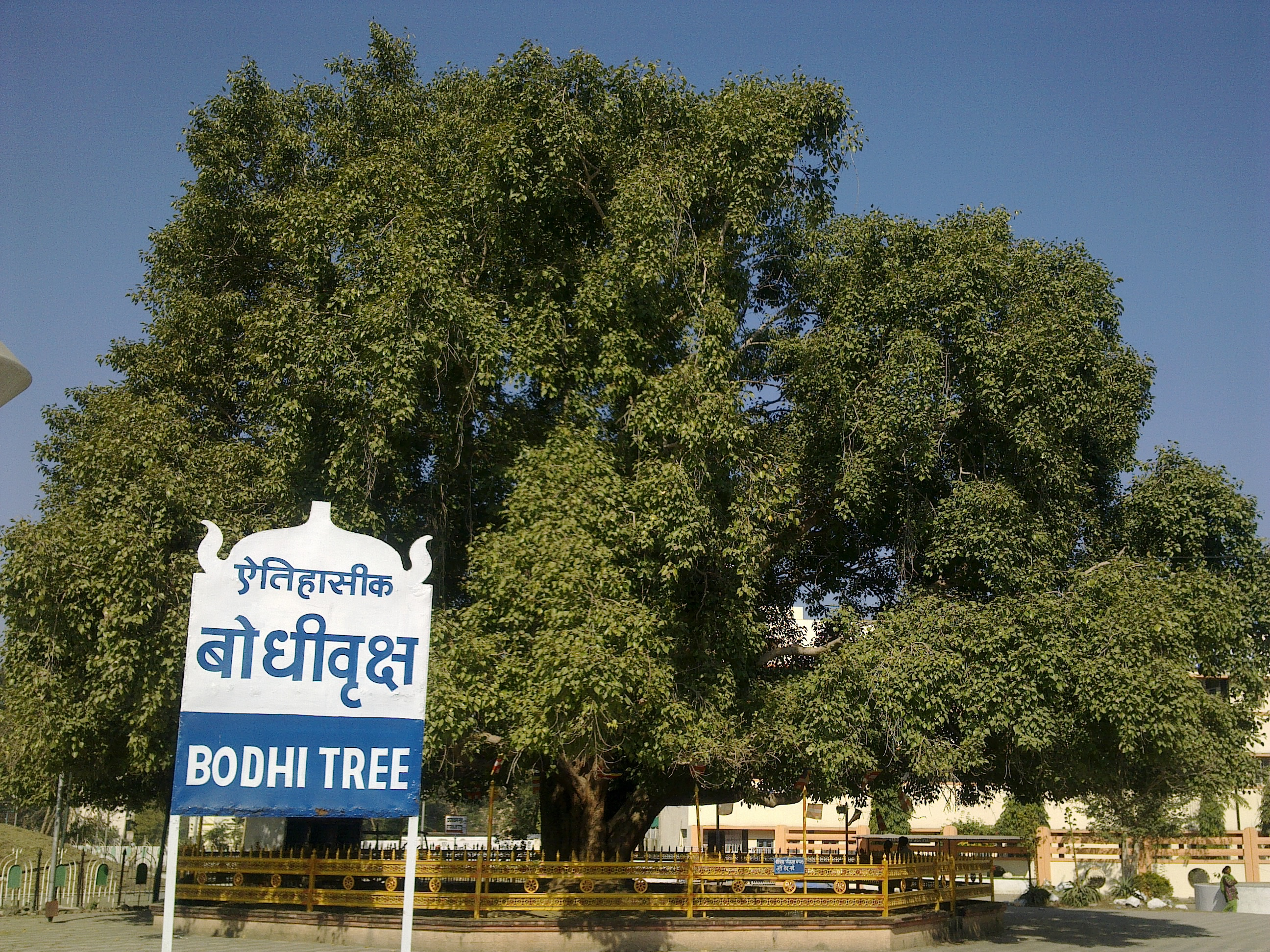
The Bodhi Tree at Deekshabhoomi

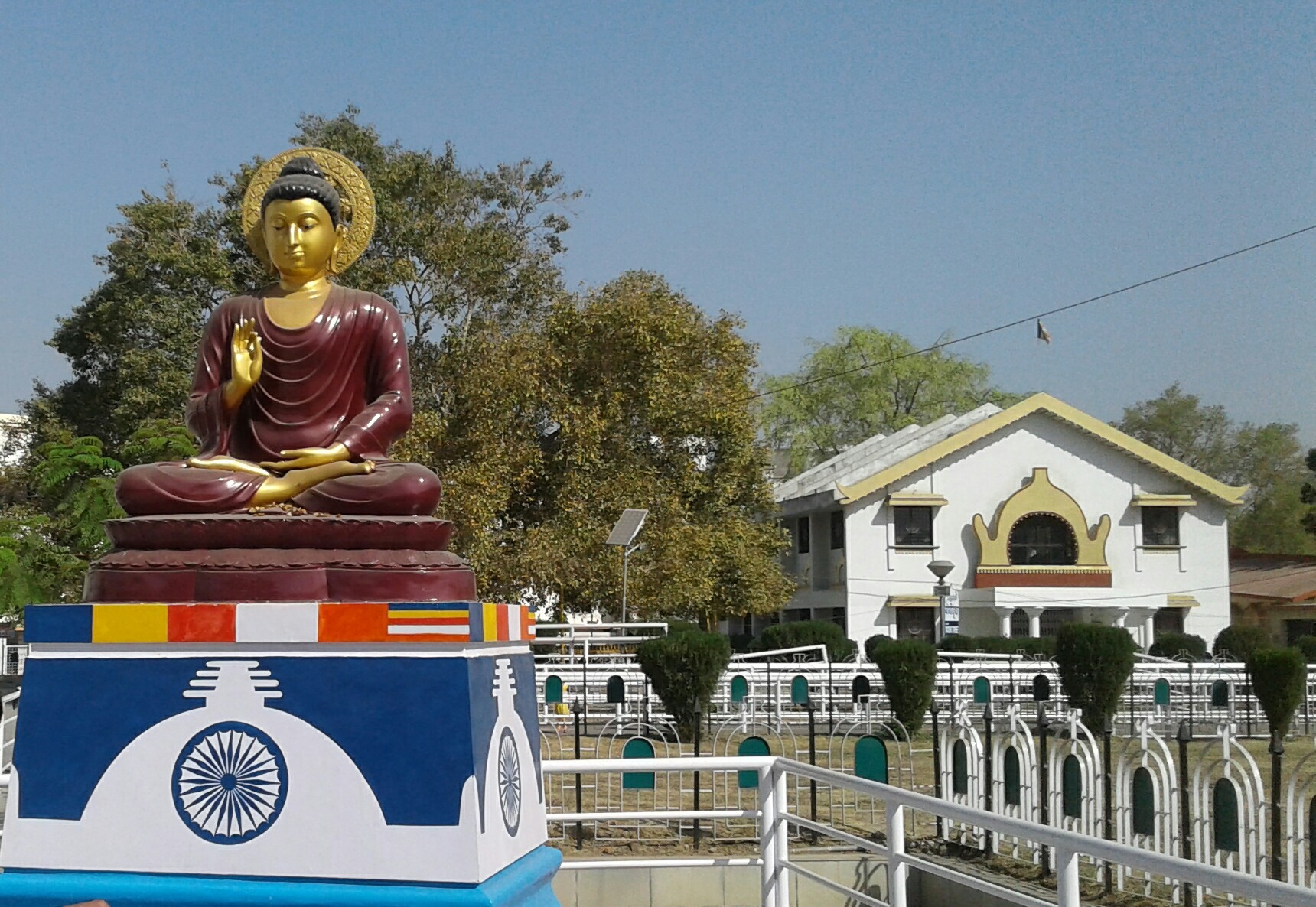
Buddha's statue is outside of Deeksha Bhoomi stupa

In front of the stupa, on the right hand side, there is a Buddha Vihara with a bronze image of Buddha.

Besides the Vihara, there is the Bodhi Tree: a sacred fig tree. This Bodhi Tree was planted at Deekshabhoomi from three branches of the Bodhi Tree at Anuradhapura in Sri Lanka. Bhadant Anand Kausalyayan brought these branches from Sri Lanka as a memorial of Buddha's enlightenment.

== Tourism ==
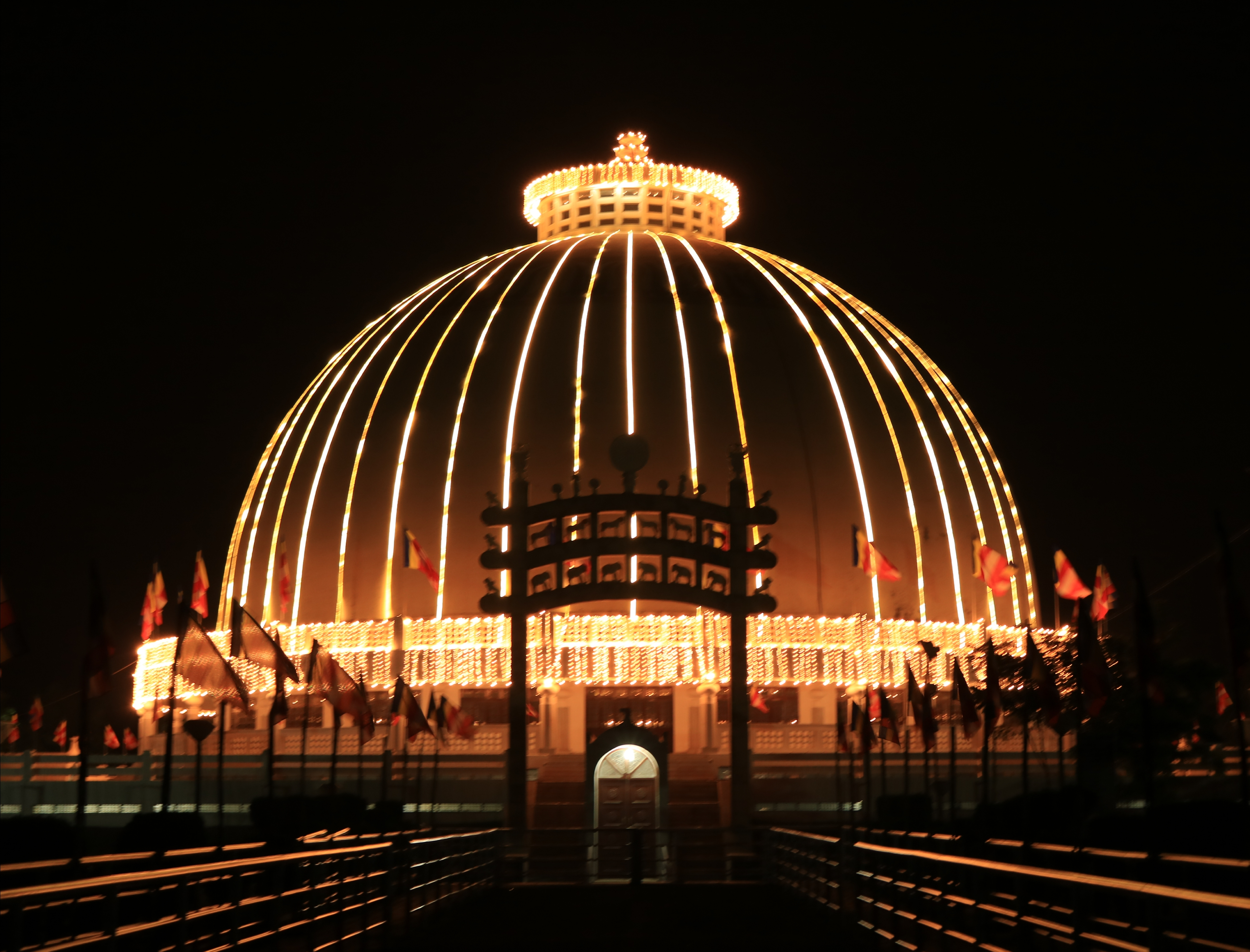
Deekshabhoomi in night.

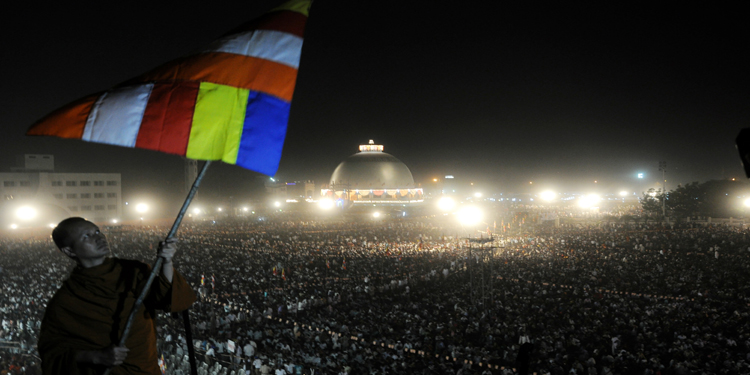
Marathi Buddhists gather to Dhammachakra Pravartan Din celebration at Deekshabhoomi and a bhikkhu holds the Buddhist flag.

Deeksha Bhoomi hosts a memorial to Ambedkar and has been graded an A-class tourism and pilgrimage site by the Government of Maharashtra. Deekshabhoomi is famous for its architectural beauty and historical importance. It is one of the main centers of tourism in India. Every year, thousands of tourists visit Deekshabhoomi, especially on the anniversary of the conversion ceremony. On Dhamma Chakra Pravartan Din, thousands of compact cassettes of Ambedkar, Ambedkar movement and Buddha songs are sold at Deekshabhoomi. The books of few crore rupees in different languages are sold in a single day, this makes Deekshabhoomi a unique place in the world.

Foreign tourists come mainly from the Buddhist countries such as Japan and Thailand.

== Literature ==
- Special issue of Lokrajya, the publication of Govt. of Maharashtra on silver jubilee of 1956 ceremony.
- Deeksha, Special issue of Daily Sakaal in October 2005
- "दीक्षाभूमी'चा भूखंड आवळेबाबूंच्या संघर्षाचे फलित

== See also ==
- The Buddha and His Dhamma
- Bhadant Nagarjun Arya Surai Sasai
- Chaitya Bhoomi
- Dalit Buddhist Movement
- Deekshabhoomi Express
- Global Vipassana Pagoda
- Statue of Equality
