= Dhammachakra Pravartan Din =

Buddhist festival

Dhammachakra Anuvartan Din
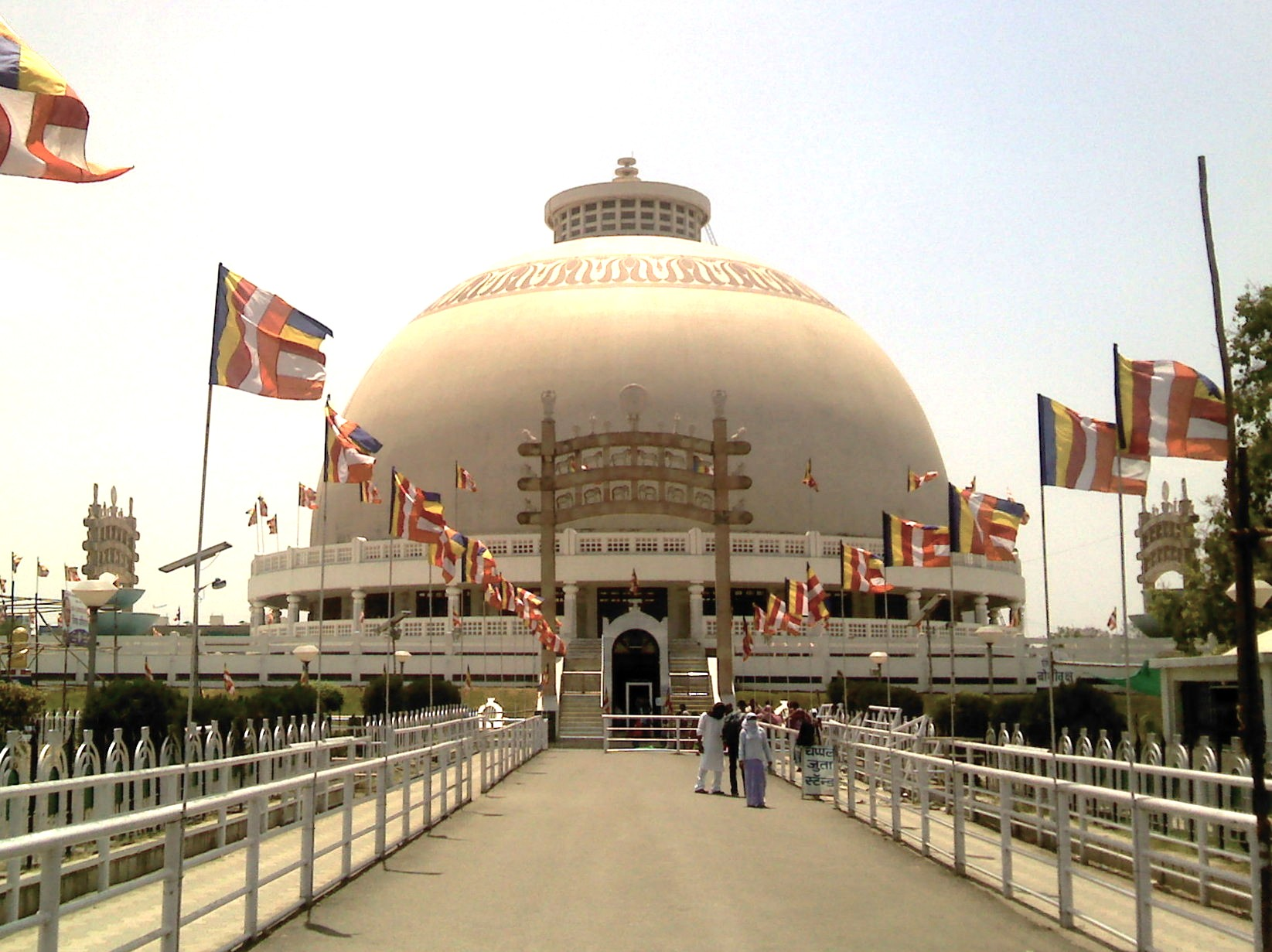
- Dhammachakra Anuvartan Din on 14-15 October at the area of Nagpur, Maharashtra, India
- Official name: • धम्मचक्र अनुवर्तन दिन • धम्मचक्र अनुवर्तन दिन
- Also called: • Dhammachakra Anuvartan Din • Dhammachakra Anuvartan Diwas • Dhammachakra Anuvartan Day
- Observed by: Buddhists
- Type: Buddhist, cultural
- Significance: Celebrates the anniversary of Babasaheb Ambedkar's conversion to Buddhism
- Date: 14-15 October 1956
- Duration: 2 day
- Frequency: annual
- Related to: Buddhism

Dhammachakra Anuvartan Din or Dhammachakra Anuvartan Diwas (translation: Dhamma Wheel's Promulgation Day) is a Buddhist festival in India. This is the day to celebrate the Buddhist acceptance of B. R. Ambedkar and his approximately 3,80,000 followers on 14 October & 2,20,000 followers on 15 October 1956 at Deekshabhoomi, Nagpur.

Dhammachakra Anuvartan Din is a day when the architect of the Indian Constitution Dr. Babasaheb Ambedkar renounced Hinduism and accepted Buddhism. It is primarily celebrated at Deeksha Bhoomi every year.

Every year on Ashoka Vijayadashami, millions of Buddhists gather at Deekshabhoomi to celebrate the mass conversion. October 2016 marked the Every year, thousands of people convert to Buddhism on Dhammachakra Anuvartan Din and Ashoka Vijayadashami at Deekshbhoomi, Nagpur. Here in 2018, around 65,000 people and in 2019, 67,543 people converted to Buddhism.

== See also ==
- Ambedkar Jayanti
- Buddha's Birthday
- Marathi Buddhists
