= Navayana =

Contemporary Indian branch of Buddhism

Navayāna
- नवयान
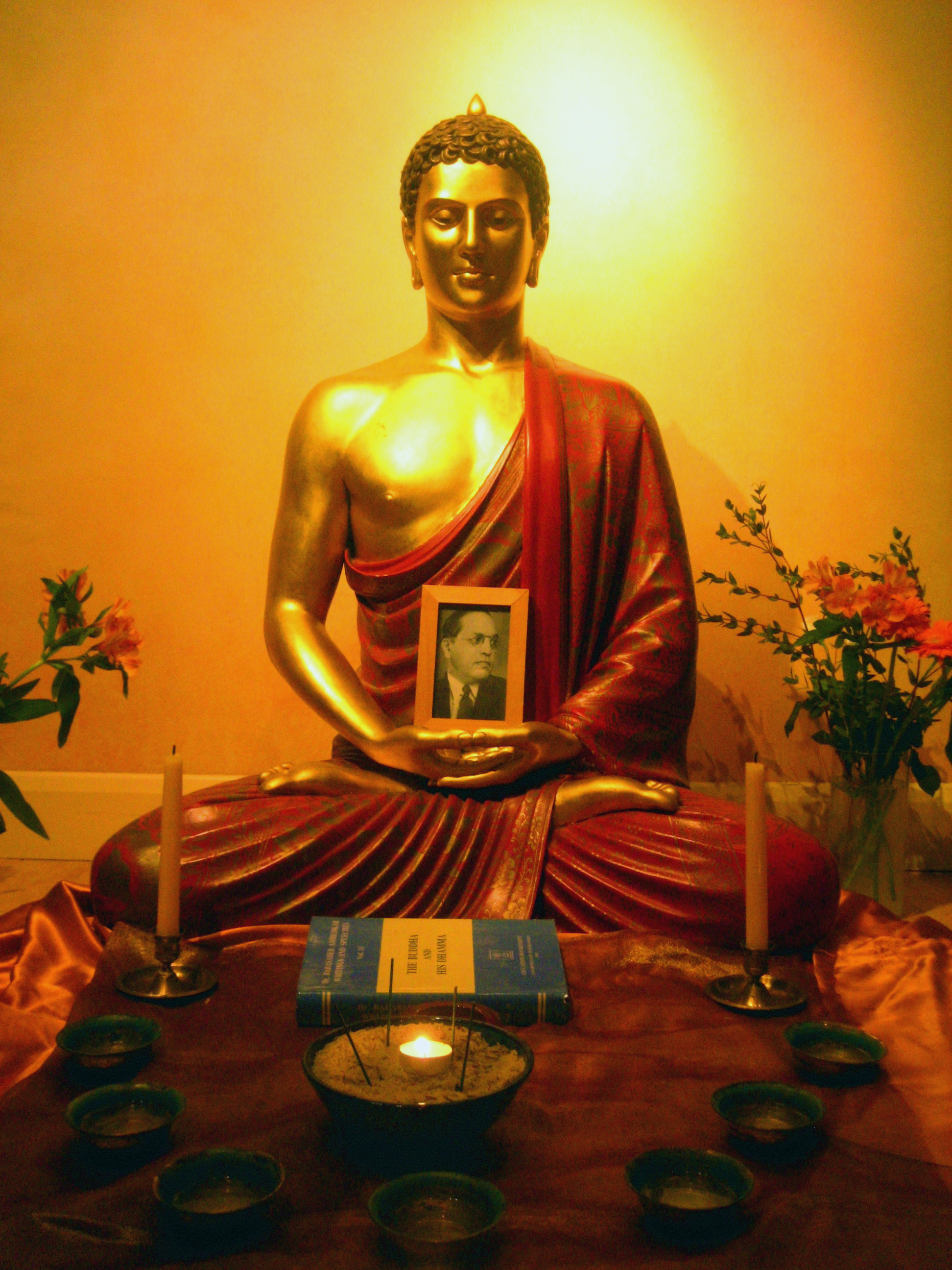
- A Navayāna Buddhist shrine with Ambedkar's portrait and The Buddha and His Dhamma book. The photograph is on the event of the 50th Dhammachakra Pravartan Day.
- Type: Dharmic
- Moderator: Bodhisattva Ambedkar
- Region: India
- Founder: B. R. Ambedkar
- Origin: 1956; Deekshabhoomi, Nagpur, India
- Members: 7.30 million followers (2011)

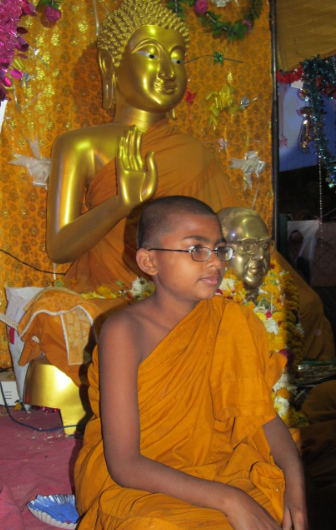
Young Indian samanera (novice Buddhist monk) in an Indian vihara. There are statues of Gautama Buddha and B. R. Ambedkar depicted as a bodhisattva.

Navayāna (Devanagari: नवयान, IAST: Navayāna, meaning "New Vehicle"), otherwise known as Navayāna Buddhism, Neo-Buddhism, and Ambedkarite Buddhism, refers to a school of engaged Buddhism founded and developed by the Indian jurist, social reformer, and scholar B. R. Ambedkar. (Note: Bhimrao Ramji Ambedkar is also called Babasaheb Ambedkar.) Its members describe the school as the "application of Buddhist principles for the welfare of the many."

Ambedkar was an Indian lawyer, politician, and scholar of Buddhism, and the Drafting Chairman of the Constitution of India. He was born into an "untouchable" family during the colonial era of India, studied abroad, and became a Dalit leader. In 1935, he announced his intent to convert from Hinduism to a different religion, an endeavor which led him to study all the major religions of the world in depth—namely Hinduism, Buddhism, Sikhism, Christianity, and Islam—for nearly 21 years. Ambedkar soon created a new school of Buddhism, posthumously named Ambedkarite Buddhism. Ambedkar held a conference on 13 October 1956, announcing his rejection of Hinduism. Thereafter, he left Hinduism and adopted Buddhism as his religious faith, about six weeks before his death. Adherents see Navayāna Buddhism not as a sect with radically different ideas, but rather as a new social movement founded on the principles of Buddhism.

To mainstream Buddhists outside the subcontinent, Navayāna is not considered an independent new branch of Buddhism like the branches of Theravāda, Mahāyāna, and Vajrayāna, which they do consider legitimate lineages in the Buddhist tradition. (Note: "... the Buddhism upon which [Ambedkar] settled and about which he wrote in The Buddha and his Dhamma was, in many respects, unlike any form of Buddhism that had hitherto arisen within the tradition. Gone, for instance, were the doctrines of karma and rebirth, the traditional emphasis on renunciation of the world, the practice of meditation, and the experience of enlightenment. Gone too were any teachings that implied the existence of a trans-empirical realm ... . Most jarring, perhaps—especially among more traditional Buddhists—was the absence of the Four Noble Truths, which Ambedkar regarded as the invention of wrong-headed monks.") Instead, Navayāna is viewed as a radical and political re-interpretation of Buddhism; (Note: Ambedkar's interpretation of Buddhism was a radical one; it took a revisionist approach to a number of widely accepted traditional Buddhist teachings.) Ambedkar regarded Buddhism to be a better alternative than Marxism or communism, taking into account social division within Indian society as opposed to homogeneous European societies.

While the term Navayāna is most commonly used in reference to the movement that Ambedkar founded in India, it is also (more rarely) used in a different sense, to refer to Westernized forms of Buddhism. Ambedkar called his version of Buddhism Navayāna or "Neo-Buddhism". His book, The Buddha and His Dhamma, is considered the primary doctrine of Buddhism by Navayāna Buddhists. The followers of Navayāna Buddhism are generally called "Buddhists" (Bauddha) as well as Ambedkarite Buddhists, Neo-Buddhists, and rarely Navayāna Buddhists. Almost 90% of Navayāna Buddhists live in Maharashtra.

== History ==
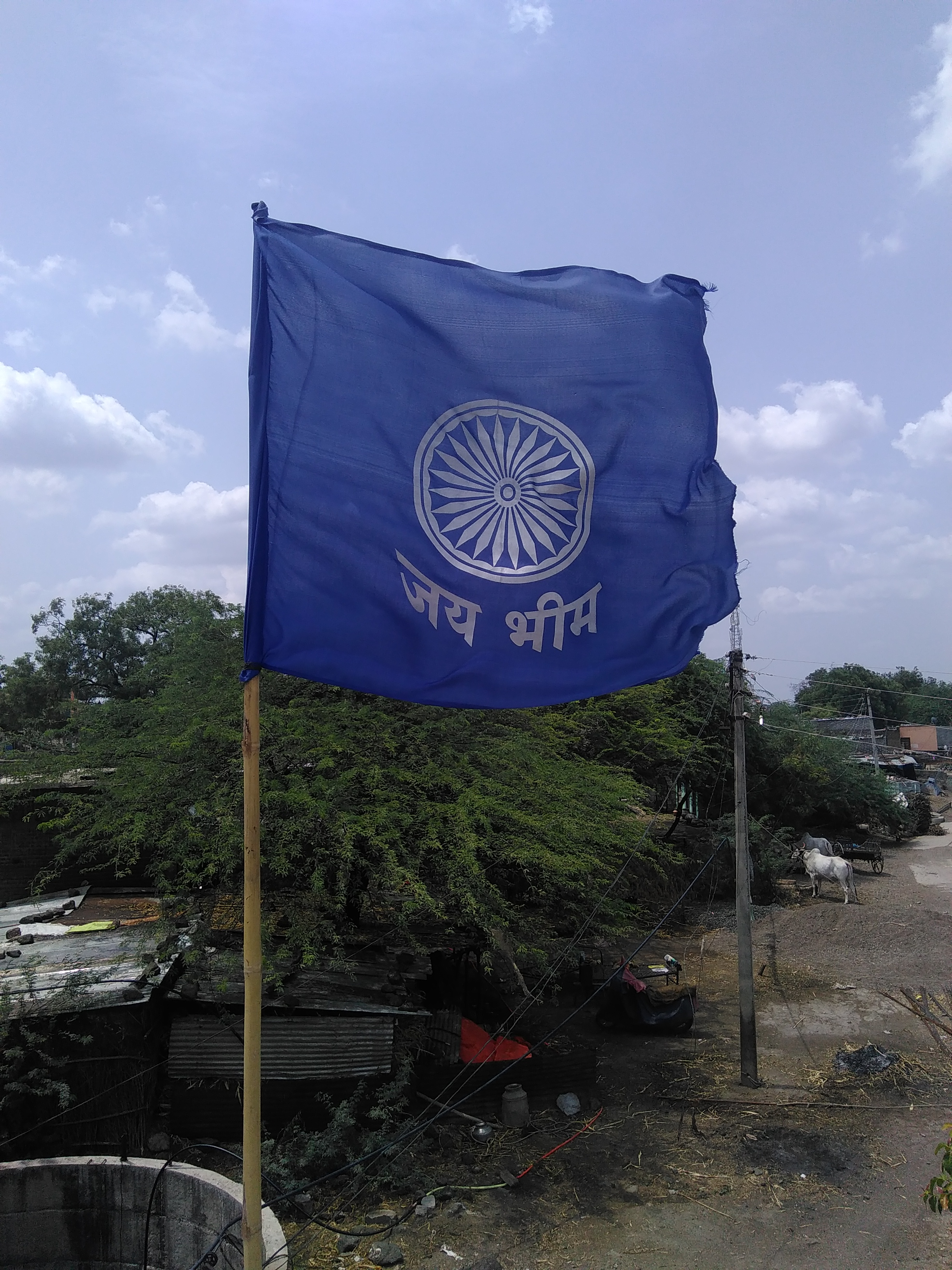
Navayāna Buddhist flag

Bhimrao R. Ambedkar was an Indian leader influential during the colonial era and the early post-independence period of India. He was the fourteenth child in an impoverished Maharashtra Scheduled Caste family who studied abroad, returned to India in the 1920s, and joined the political movement. His focus was social and political rights for the Depressed class community. To free his community from religious prejudice, he concluded that they must leave Hinduism and convert to a different religion. He chose Buddhism as the only way to end human suffering.

In 1935, following disagreements with Mahatma Gandhi, Ambedkar announced his intent to convert from Hinduism to Buddhism. Over the next two decades, Ambedkar studied Buddhist texts and wrote The Buddha and His Dhamma which is considered the primary doctrine of those who follow Navayāna Buddhism.

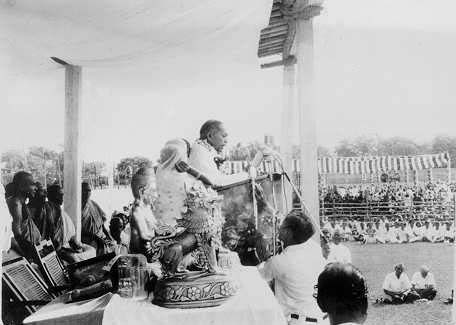
Ambedkar delivering a speech during mass conversion in Nagpur, 14 October 1956

Ambedkar established Navayāna Buddhism in 1956, and 380,000 oppressed community members converted to Navayāna Buddhism from Hinduism on 14 and 15 October 1956. Consequently, 14 October is celebrated annually as Dhammachakra Pravartan Day at Dikshabhoomi, Nagpur:

I will accept and follow the teachings of Buddha. I will keep my people away from the different opinions of Hinayana and Mahayana, two religious orders. Our Buddhism is a Neo-Buddhism, Navayana.

— B.R. Ambedkar, press interview (1956)

Ambedkar re-emphasized Buddhist principles to address modern issues. Sumant (2004) states that Navayāna dhamma doctrine as propounded by Ambedkar "does not situate morality in a transcendental [religious] domain" nor in "a civil association, including the state". Dhamma is derived from and is the guiding principle for social conscience.

== Scripture and practice ==
Ambedkar's writings were posthumously published as The Buddha and His Dhamma, and Navayāna Buddhism followers consider the book to be a culmination of the important teachings of Buddha. Among Navayāna followers, state Keown & Prebish (2013), this is "often referred to as their 'bible' and its novel interpretation of the Buddhist path commonly constitutes their only source of knowledge on the subject".

Ambedkar is regarded as a bodhisattva, the Maitreya, among Navayāna Buddhists. Deitrick (2013) states that in practice, followers revere Ambedkar as virtually on par with the Buddha. He is considered the one prophesied to appear and teach the dhamma after it was forgotten; his iconography is a part of Navayāna Buddhist shrines and he is shown with a halo. Though Ambedkar states Navayāna to be an atheist form of Buddhism, Navayāna viharas and shrines feature images of the Buddha and Ambedkar, and the followers bow and offer prayers before them. According to Junghare (1988), for the followers of Navayāna, Ambedkar has become a deity and is devotionally worshipped.

== Reception ==
Ambedkar's re-interpretation of Buddhism and his formulation of Navayāna have attracted admirers and criticism. Navayāna theories restate the core doctrines of Buddhism, according to Zelliot & Macy (1980), wherein Ambedkar's "social emphasis exclude[s] or distort some teaching, fundamental to traditional and canonical Buddhism". Anne Blackburn states that Ambedkar re‑interprets core concepts of Buddhism in class conflict terms, where nirvana is not the aim and end of spiritual pursuits, but a preparation for social action against inequality:

Nibbāna (Skt. nirvāṇa) the state or process which describes enlightenment, is considered [by Ambedkar] a precursor for moral action in the world and explicitly associated with a non-monastic lifestyle. Nibbāna "means enough control over passion so as to enable one to walk on the path of righteousness". Ambedkar's interpretation of dukkha and nibbāna implies that moral action, for which nibbāna is preparation, will rectify the material suffering of inequality.

Ambedkar considered all ideas in Theravāda and Mahāyāna Buddhism that relate to an individual's merit and spiritual development to be insertions into Buddhism, and something that "cannot be accepted to be the word of the Buddha". Buddhism, to Ambedkar, must have been a social reform movement. Martin Fuchs states that Ambedkar's effort is to be admired as an attempt to seek a "post-religious religion" that transcends distinctions and is driven by the "reasonable principle of sociality", not in the sense of spiritual doctrines, philosophical speculations, and existentialist questions. According to Blackburn, "neither view of traditional Buddhism—as a social reform movement or as some other stable entity interpreted (or misinterpreted) from a social reform perspective—is historically accurate", thereby placing Navayāna theories as ahistorical, though it served as an important means for Dalit political mobilization and social movement.

Scholars broadly accept that the depictions of the Buddha as a social reformer are inaccurate. (Note: It has been long recognised that Buddhism and Jainism were not movements for social reform, and that the Buddha's doctrine did not aim at transformation or improvement of the social conditions.) Gombrich (2012) states that there is no evidence that the Buddha began or pursued social reforms; rather, his aim was the salvation of those who joined his monastic order. Modernist interpreters of Buddhism, states Gombrich, keep picking up this "mistake from western authors", a view that initially came into vogue during the colonial era.

Richard Gombrich adds that Buddha should not be seen as a social reformer: "his concern was to reform individuals and help them leave society forever, not to reform the world... He never preached against social inequality, only declared its irrelevance to salvation. He never tried to abolish the caste system nor to do away with slavery"

Empirical evidence outside India, such as in the Theravāda Buddhist monasteries of the Sinhalese society, suggests that class ideas have been prevalent among the sangha monks, and between the Buddhist monks and the laity. In all canonical Buddhist texts, the khattiyas (warrior class) are always mentioned first and never other classes such as brahmans, vessas, or suddas.

However, Ambedkar's idea of a casteless society as part of Buddhism is well-supported by the relatively late dating of Buddhist sutras about caste and the lack of mention of the caste-class terms khattiyas, vessas, or sudras in Ashokan era government edicts and documents, all of which heavily precede the later establishment of caste-class ideas in Sinhalese and Indian Buddhist societies.

Ambedkar's novel interpretations and radical reinterpretation of mainstream doctrines of Buddhism, as he formulated Navayāna, have led some external groups to suggest that Navayāna may more properly be called "Ambedkarism". However, Ambedkar did not consider himself as the originator of a new Buddhism, but stated that he was merely reviving what was original Buddhism after centuries of "misguided interpretation" by wrong-headed Buddhist monks. Skaria states that others consider Ambedkar to have attempted a synthesis of the ideas of modern Karl Marx into the structure of ideas by the ancient Buddha, as Ambedkar worked on essays on both in the final years of his life.

According to Janet Contursi, Ambedkar re-interprets the Buddhist religion and, with Navayāna, "speaks through Gautama and politicizes the Buddha philosophy as he theologizes his own political views".

== Status in India ==
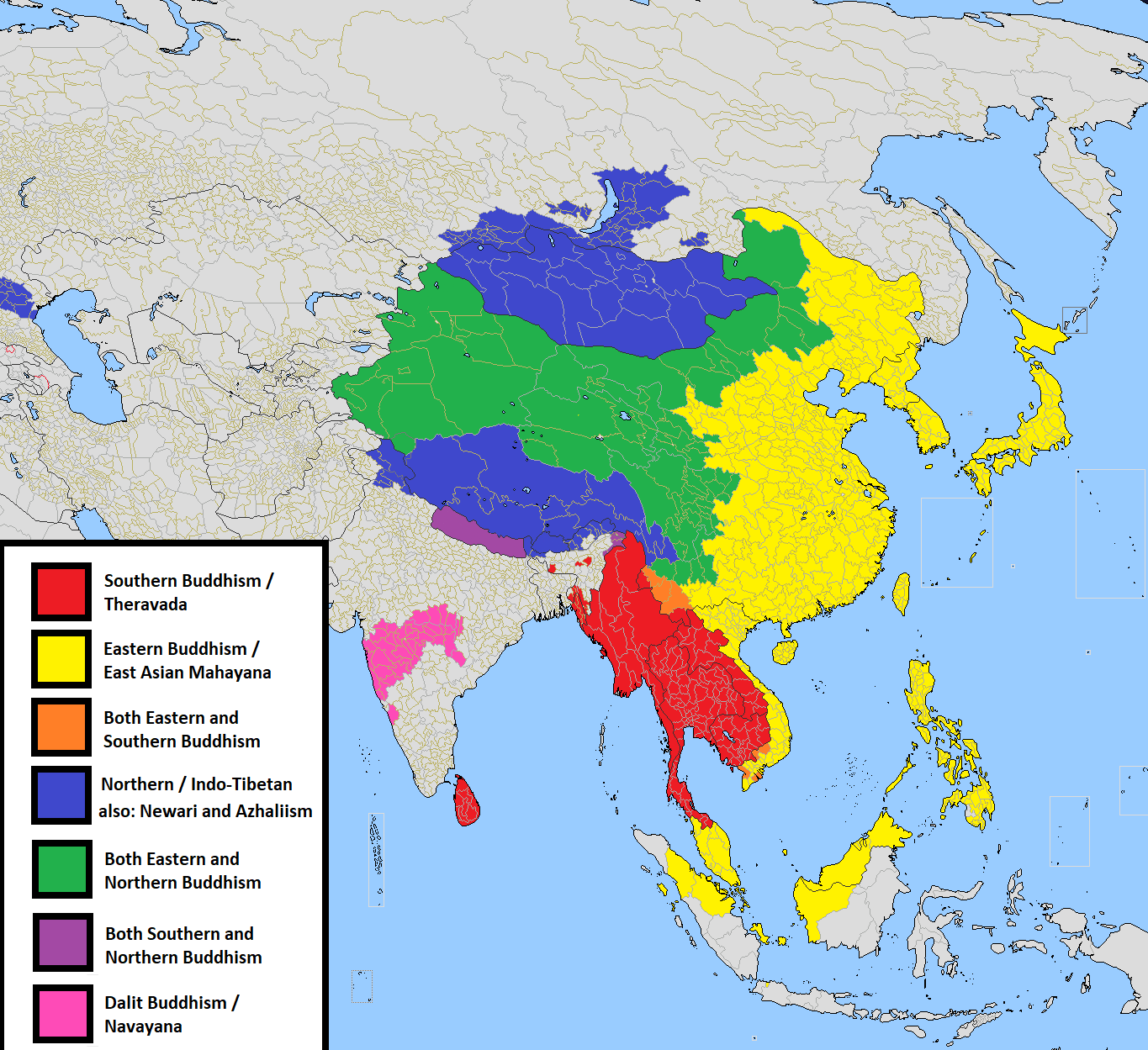
Map showing major Buddhist divisions, Navayāna in pink

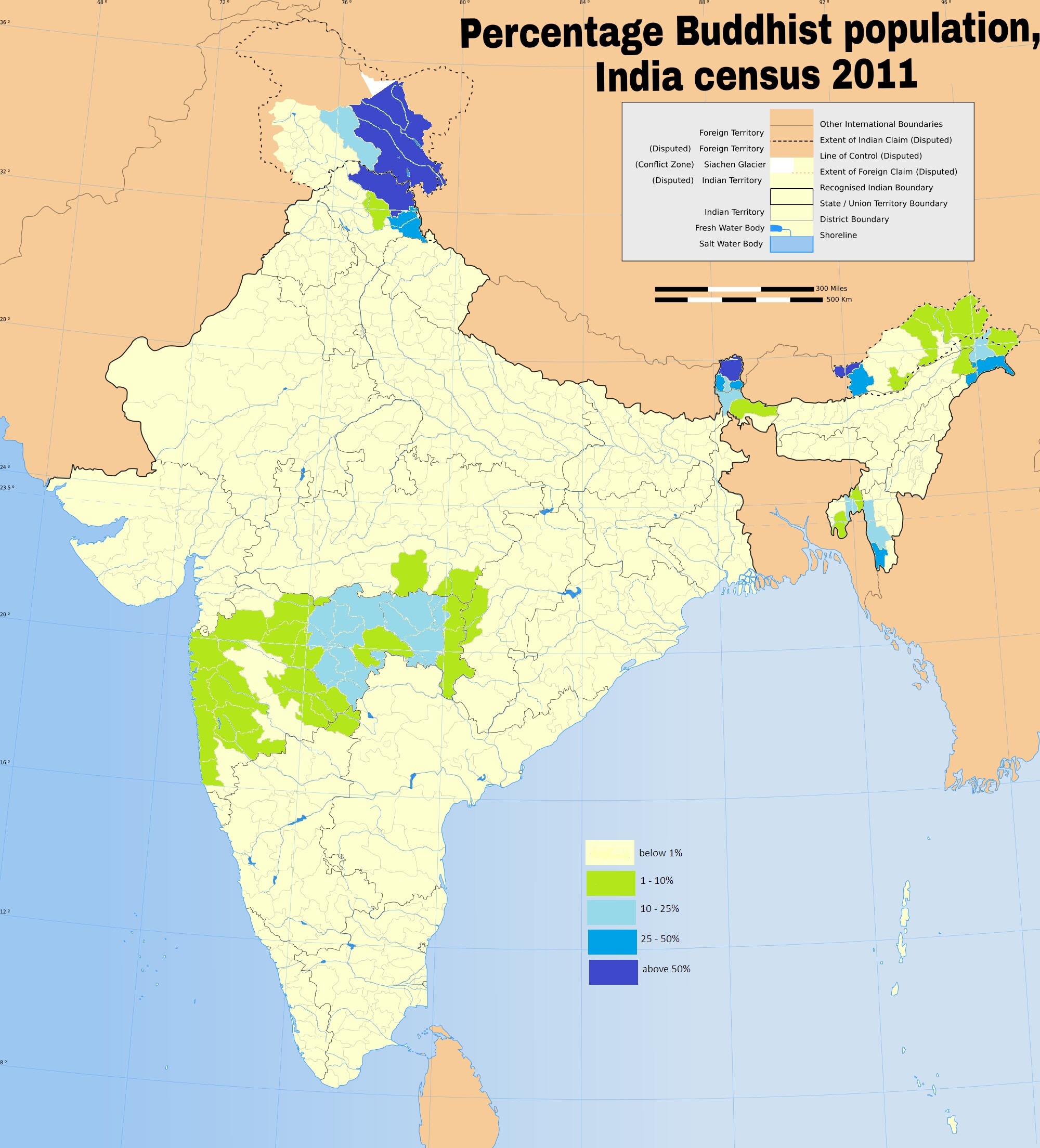
Buddhist population percentage by district, India census 2011. India's Maharashtra has a high concentration of Navayāna Marathi Buddhists.

The Scheduled Castes Order (Amendment) Act, 1990 granted reservation to Dalit Buddhists and recognized their Scheduled Caste status.

According to the 2011 Census of India there are 8.4 million Buddhists in India. Navayāna Buddhists comprise about 87% (7.3 million) of the Indian Buddhist community, with nearly 90% (6.5 million) of all Navayāna Buddhists in India living in Maharashtra state. A 2017 IndiaSpend.com report on census data says "Buddhists have a literacy rate of 81.29%, higher than the national average of 72.98%", but it does not distinguish Navayāna Buddhists from other Buddhists. When compared to overall literacy rate of Maharashtra state where 80% of Buddhists are found, their literacy rate is 83.17% or slightly higher than statewide average of 82.34%.

According to Jean Darian, the conversion to Buddhism and its growth in India have been in part due to nonreligious factors, in particular the political and economic needs of the community, the needs of the political leaders, and the expanding administrative structure in India.

== Festivals ==
Major festivals among Navayāna Buddhists are:

- Ambedkar Jayanti
- Dhammachakra Pravartan Day
- Buddha's Birthday

== See also ==
- Buddhism in India
- Buddhist modernism
- Buddhist socialism
- Engaged Buddhism
- Humanistic Buddhism
- Marathi Buddhists

== Bibliography ==
- Dietrick, Jim (2013). Keown, Damien; Prebish, Charles S. (eds.). Encyclopedia of Buddhism. Routledge. pp. 24–26. ISBN 978-1-136-98588-1.
- Queen, Christopher (2015). Emmanuel, Steven M. (ed.). A Companion to Buddhist Philosophy. John Wiley & Sons. ISBN 978-1-119-14466-3.
