= Dr. B. R. Ambedkar (film) =

2005 Indian Kannada-language film by Sharan Kumar Kabbur

- DVD cover
- Directed by: Sharan Kumar Kabbur
- Screenplay by: Sharan Kumar Kabbur
- Story by: Vishnukanth B. J.
- Produced by: Vishnukanth B. J.
- Starring: Vishnukanth B. J. Tara; Bhavya
- Cinematography: Renuka Aradhya
- Edited by: M. N. Swamy
- Music by: Abhimann Roy
- Release date: 30 December 2005
- Running time: 119 minutes
- Country: India
- Language: Kannada

Dr. B. R. Ambedkar is a 2005 Indian biographical film in Kannada, based on the life of Indian social reformer, jurist, academic-politician, B. R. Ambedkar. The film covers the period from his birth right up to his death. The actress Tara plays the role of Ambedkar's first wife Ramabai Ambedkar, while Bhavya plays Savita Ambedkar, his second wife. The film is directed by Sharan Kumar Kabbur.

== Cast ==
- Vishnukanth B. J. as B. R. Ambedkar
- Bhavya as Savita Ambedkar
- Tara as Ramabai
- C. Ashwath
- Datthathreya
- Padma Vasanthi
- Rajeshwari
- M. N. Swamy
- Ammanapura
- Pallakki Radhakrishna
- Dr. Purushottham
- Gururaj Hosakote
- Biradar
- Shivakumar Aradhya
- Rajashekar
- Master Manu
- Master Sandeep
- Master Bharath
- Master Ramprasad
- Master Guruprasad

== Soundtrack ==
All the songs are composed by Abhimann Roy and written by Siddalingaiah, Goturi and Vishnukanth.

No.	Song	Singers
1	"Jo Jo"	Nanditha
2	"Baaramma Rama"	Nanditha
3	"Rama Namavu"	Abhiman
4	"Koolillade"	Shankar Shanbhag
5	"Naada Naduvininda"	Gurumurthi

== Awards ==
- Karnataka State Film Awards 2005–06
- Best Male Dubbing Artist – Ravindranath
- Special Award by Jury

== See also ==
- Dr. Babasaheb Ambedkar
- Ramabai
- Ramabai Bhimrao Ambedkar
