= Ramabai =

Ramabai may refer to:

== People ==
- Ramabai Peshwa (1750–1772), wife of Madhavrao Peshwa I, ruler of the Maratha Empire in India
- Pandita Ramabai (1858–1922), Indian reformer for women's rights and education
- Ramabai Bhimrao Ambedkar (1897–1935), wife of the Indian politician B. R. Ambedkar

== Films ==
- Ramabai (film) (2016) about Ramabai Bhimrao Ambedkar
- Ramabai Bhimrao Ambedkar (film) (2011)

== See also ==
- Rambai (disambiguation)
- Rambaiyin Kaadhal (disambiguation)
- Ramabai Ambedkar Nagar, a colony in Mumbai India; site of the 1997 Ramabai killings
