= Rajgruha =

Memorial and home of B. R. Ambedkar in Mumbai, India

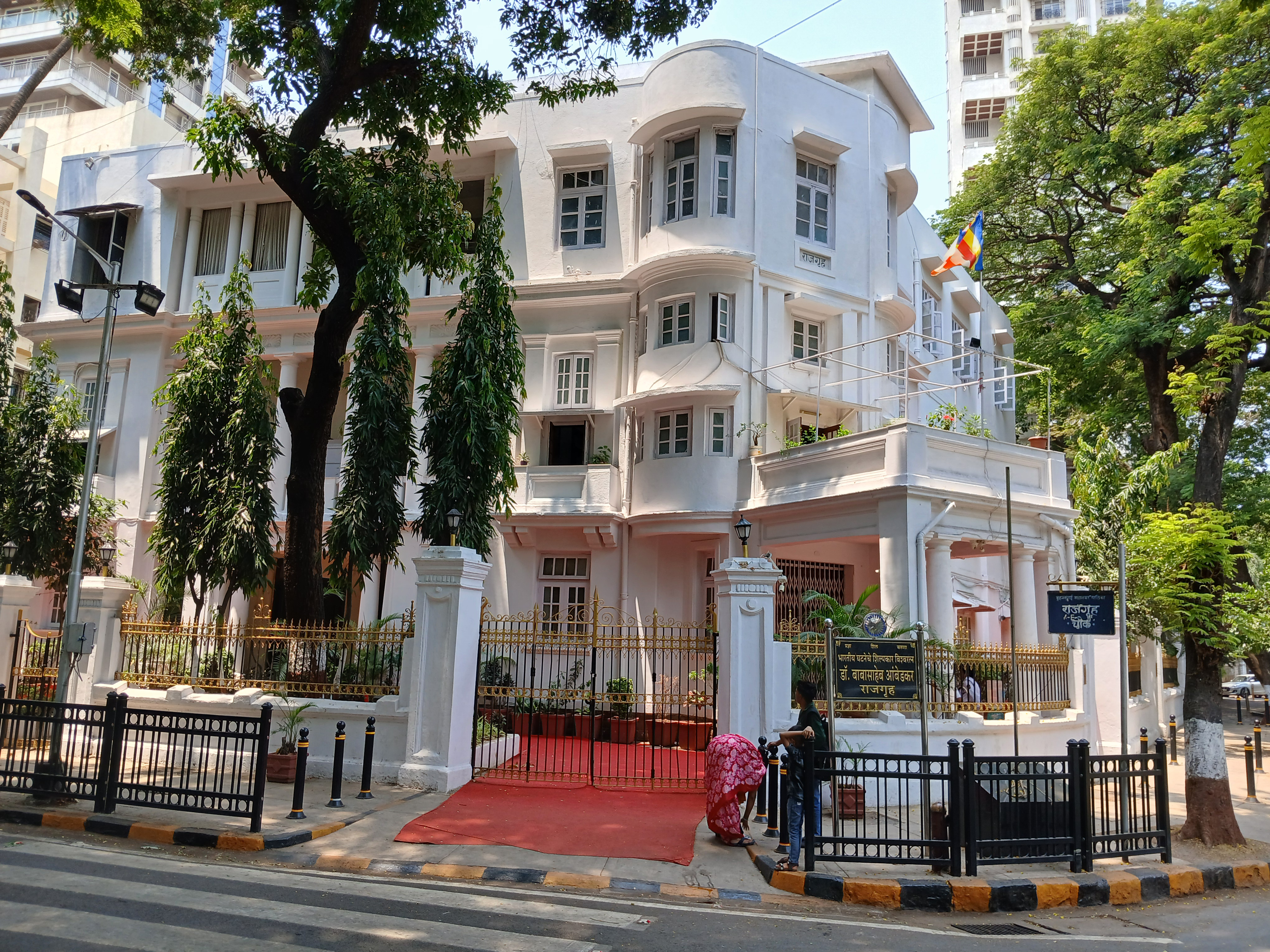
- Rajgruha, the residence of Ambedkar in Dadar, Mumbai
- Interactive map of Rajgruha
- Location: Hindu colony, Dadar, Mumbai, Maharashtra, India
- Coordinates: 19.0214°N 72.8476°E
- Designer: B. R. Ambedkar
- Type: Memorial
- Beginning date: 1931
- Completion date: 1933
- Dedicated to: B. R. Ambedkar

Rajgruha (alternative spelling: Rajgraha and Rajgriha) is a memorial and house of the leader B. R. Ambedkar at Hindu colony of Dadar in Mumbai, India. It was named after Rajgriha (now Rajgir), in reference to the ancient Hindu-Buddhist kingdom. The ground floor of the three-story building hosts a heritage museum, as a memorial to the Indian leader.

This place is a popular site for Ambedkarite Buddhists and Dalits . Ambedkar lived at Rajgruha for 15-20 years. Millions of people visit the site before the Chaitya Bhoomi in Shivaji Park on 6 December. Ambedkar collected more than 50,000 books during his time at Rajgruha, which made it one of the largest personal libraries in the world at the time of his death. Plans to designate the building as a national monument fell through due to legal and technical issues, but in 2013 the mansion became a heritage monument.

== History ==
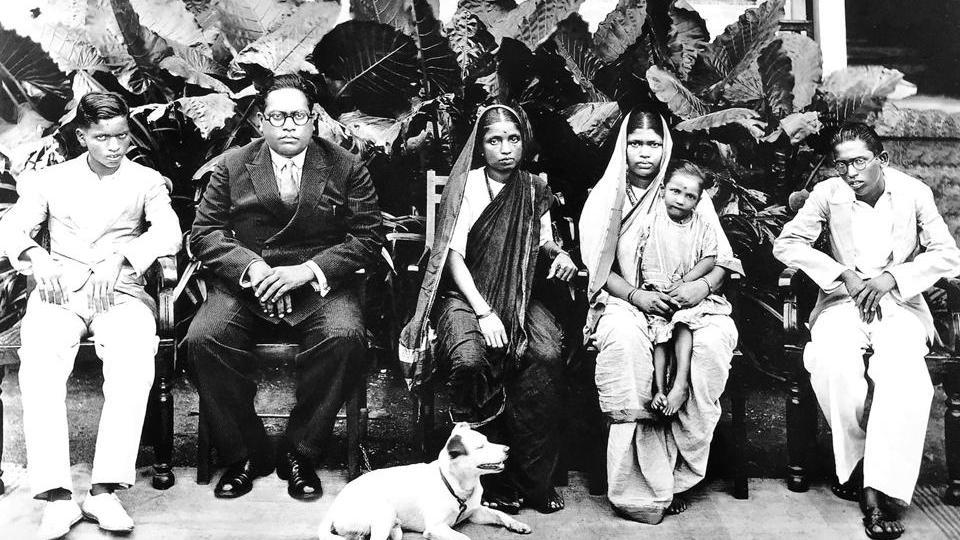
Babasaheb Ambedkar with his family members at Rajgruha, his residence in the Hindu Colony of Dadar (Bombay). From left – Yashwant (Son), Babasaheb Ambedkar, Smt. Ramabai (Wife), Smt. Laxmibai (Wife of his elder brother, Anand), Mukund (Nephew) and Dr. Ambedkar’s dog, Tobby. February 1934

Bhimrao was born into abject poverty. By 1930, however, his financial situation improved as he became a well-known barrister.

Ambedkar's legal office was near Damodar Hall in Parel. Eventually Ambedkar's house at Prabhadevi could no longer accommodate his growing book collection, so he decided to build a new house for himself and his family.

Ambedkar planned for his new home to have a library. In the new structure, two blocks of three rooms were built on the ground floor of the Rajgruha. In those two blocks, his family live. On the first floor of the royal house, he arranged his library and office.

In 1930, he owned two plots on each of 99th and 129th streets, and a 55 square yard area in Dadar, a Hindu colony of Mumbai. At 129th Street in the fifth lane, he decided to build a house for his family, while he constructed a rental building on the 99th plot in the third lane. He received a loan from the Central Bank of India. Mr. Aaiskar supervised construction. In January 1931, the construction of the building on plot number 129 began and was completed in 1933. Construction of another building on plot 99 started in 1932. After finishing the construction, they named the building "Char Minar". The name "Rajgruha" was related to Buddhist culture and Hindu culture, whereas the name "Char Minar" was related to Muslim culture.

In 1933, Ambedkar, along with his family, moved in. B. R. Ambedkar, his wife Ramabai, son Yashwant, Laxmibai (wife of his brother), Mukund (his nephew), etc. lived there.

On 9 May 1941, he sold the Char Minar building to pay for the purchase of books and retire outstanding loans. However, he kept the house of Rajgruha as a permanent possession.

== Vandalism ==
On the evening of 7 July 2020, the Rajgruha was vandalized by a person. The man entered the premises of the Rajgruha and smashed flower pots, damaged plants, CCTV camera and pelted stones at a window. Then he left. Mumbai Police are investigating the spot. CCTV footage of the incident has been handed over to the police by the Ambedkar family. On same day, Matunga police have registered a case against unknown persons for vandalizing the Rajgruha. One person has been arrested in the case and further investigation is underway. Next day, On 8 July 2020, the Maharashtra government has decided to keep Rajgruha under permanent police protection. On 22 July 2020, the main accused in the attack on Rajgruha was arrested. The accused is identified as Vishal Ashok More alias Vitthal Kanya.

== See also ==
- Ambedkar family
- Chaitya Bhoomi
- Bhim Janmabhoomi
- Deekshabhoomi
- List of things named after B. R. Ambedkar
