= Vanand (disambiguation) =

Vanand is an area of historic Armenia.

Vanand may also refer to the following places:

- Vanand, Armavir, Armenia
- Vanand, Syunik, Armenia
- Vanand, Ordubad, Azerbaijan
- Vanand, Maharashtra, India
- Vanand Peak, Antarctica

== See also ==
- Vananda
