= Sulochana Dongre =

Indian activist and feminist

- Occupation: Activist
- Known for: Advocate for Birth Control and Female education
- Movement: Indian feminism

Sulochana Dongre, also known as Sulochanabai Dongre, was an Indian activist and feminist. She was a prominent advocate for birth control and female emancipation.

== Biography ==
Sulochna Dongre was born into a Mahar family in the 1930s and 40s. Dongre became a notable advocate for female emancipation. Initial affiliated with the All India Women's Conference, Dongre - along with other Dalit leaders - broke away from the conference, feeling it was too heavily dominated by the upper castes. She would go on to become a leader of the All India Depressed Classes Women Congress, and chaired a large-scale conference held by the congress in 1942. That same year, Dongre (along with Shantabai Dani) spoke before a crowd of 25,000 women at the women's conferences of an All-India Scheduled Caste Federation meeting in Nagpur. Dongre also chaired the Dalit Mahila Federation, the last Dalit feminist group to form before Indian Independence.

Notably, some sources describe Dongre as the first Indian leader to call for nation-wide access to birth control, a measure she supported.

Dongre's biography and exploits were included in Urmila Pawar's 1989 work We Also Made History.
