= Ambedkar family =

Indian family

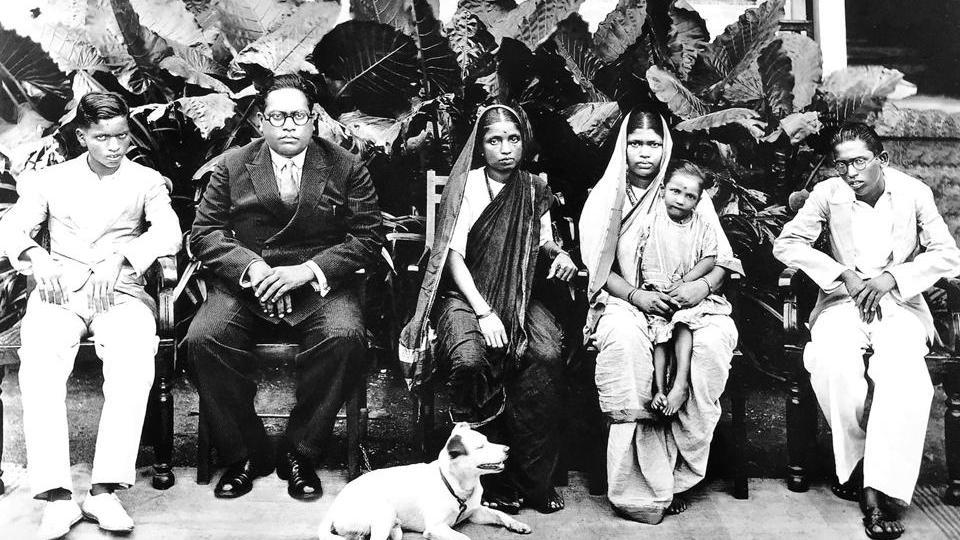
- Babasaheb Ambedkar with his family members at Rajgruha, his residence was at Hindu colony of Dadar in Bombay. From left – Yashwant (son), Babasaheb Ambedkar, Smt. Ramabai (wife), Smt. Laxmibai (wife of his elder brother, Anandrao), Mukund (nephew) and Dr. Ambedkar’s dog, Tobby. Picture taken in February 1934
- Current region: India
- Origin: Ambadawe, Ratnagiri district, Maharashtra; Mhow, Madhya Pradesh
- Members: Ramji Maloji Sakpal (father); Bhimabai Ramji Sakpal (mother); Balaram Ramji Ambedkar (brother); Gangabai Lakgawadekar (sister); Ramabai Malvanakar (sister); Anandrao Ramji Ambedkar (brother); Manjulabai Yesu Pandirkar (sister); Tulsabai Dharma Kantekar (sister); Bhimrao Ramji Ambedkar; Ramabai Bhimrao Ambedkar (wife); Savita Bhimrao Ambedkar (2nd wife); Yashwant Bhimrao Ambedkar (son); Meerabai Yashwant Ambedkar (wife of son)
- Connected members: Prakash Ambedkar (grandson); Anjali Prakash Ambedkar (wife of grandson); Ramabai Anand Teltumbde (granddaughter); Bhimrao Yashwant Ambedkar (grandson); Darshana Bhimrao Ambedkar (wife of grandson); Anandraj Ambedkar (grandson); Manisha Anandraj Ambedkar (wife of grandson); Sujat Prakash Ambedkar (great-grandson); Prachi Anandrao Teltumbde (great-granddaughter); Rashmi Anandrao Teltumbde (great-granddaughter); Hrichita Bhimrao Ambedkar (great-granddaughter); Sahil Anandraj Ambedkar (great-grandson); Aman Anandraj Ambedkar (great-grandson)
- Traditions: Buddhism

The Ambedkar family is the family of B. R. Ambedkar (14 April 1891 – 6 December 1956) who was an Indian polymath and the chairman of the Drafting Committee of the Constituent Assembly. The patriarch Ambedkar is popularly known as Babasaheb (Marathi: endearment for "father", in India).

== Family tree ==
Family of Ambedkar family

Maloji Sakpal | Mrs Sakpal
3 child | Meerabai | Bhimabai (?–1896) | Ramji Maloji Sakpal (1838–1913) | Jijabai
7 child (Died when infant) | Balaram | Ganga Lakhavdekar | Ramabai Malvankar | Anandrao | Laxmibai | Manjula Yesu Pandirkar | Tulsa Dharma Kantekar | Ramabai Ambedkar (1898–1935) | Bhimrao Ambedkar (Babasaheb) (1891–1956)
Mukund Ambedkar (1913–1959) | Shaileja | Yashwant Bhimrao Ambedkar (1912–1977) | Meera | Gangadhar (Died when infant) | Ramdesh (Died when infant) | Indu (Died when infant) | Rajratna (Died when infant)
Ashok | Ashwini | Dileep | Alaka | Vidya Kashiram Mohite (b.1949) | Sujata Ramesh Kadam | Prakash (Balasaheb) (b. 1954) | Anjali | Ramabai Anand Teltumbde | Bhimrao Yashwant Ambedkar (b. 1958) | Darshana | Anandraj (b. 1967) | Manisha
Sandesh | Charulata | Rajratna (b. 1982) | Amita | Akshay | Akshata | Sujat | Prachi | Rashmi Teltumde | Ritika | Sahil | Aman
Yash | Mayank | Prisha

== Photos ==
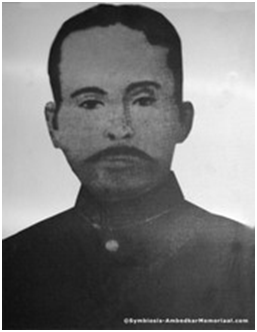
Ramji Maloji Sakpal

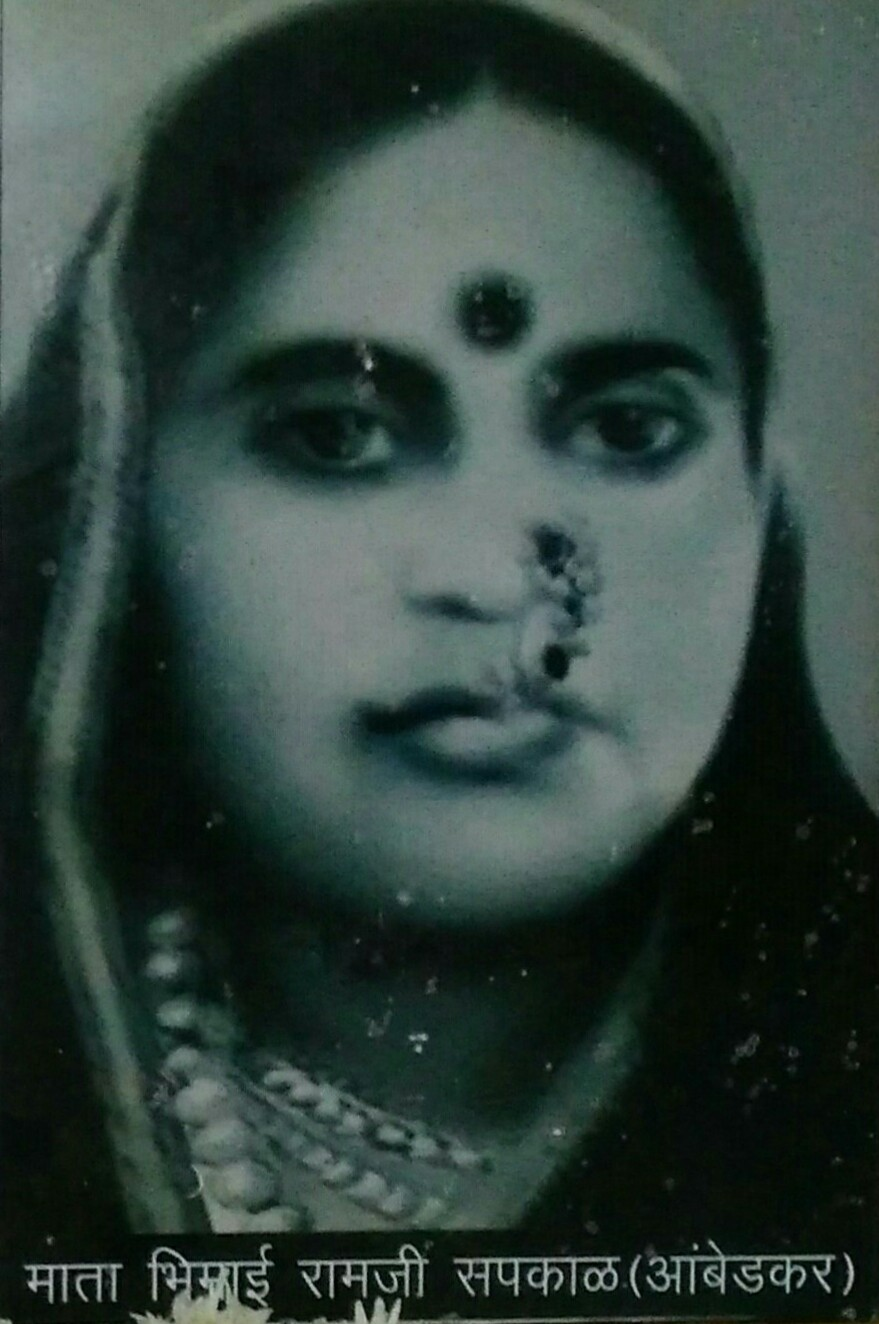
Bhimabai Ramji Sakpal

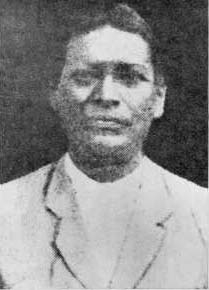
Balaram Ambedkar

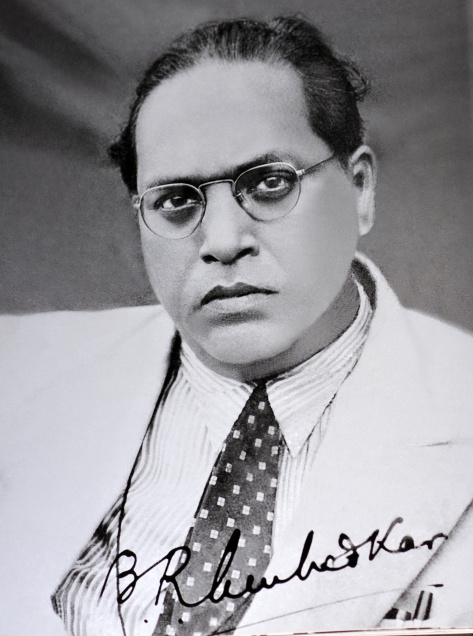
Bhimrao Ambedkar

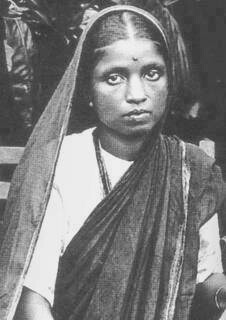
Ramabai Ambedkar

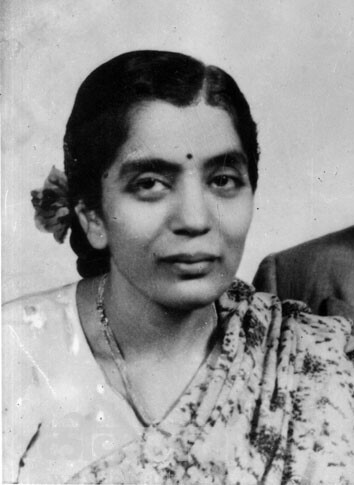
Savita Ambedkar

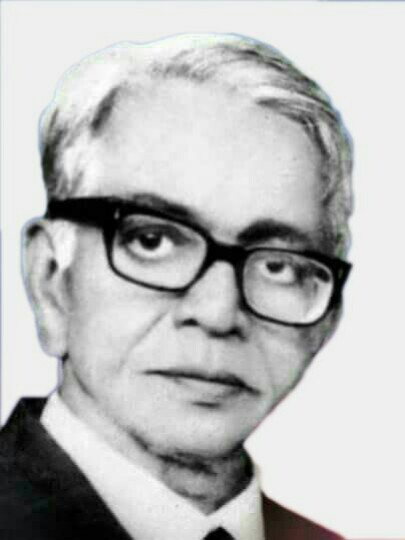
Yashwant Ambedkar

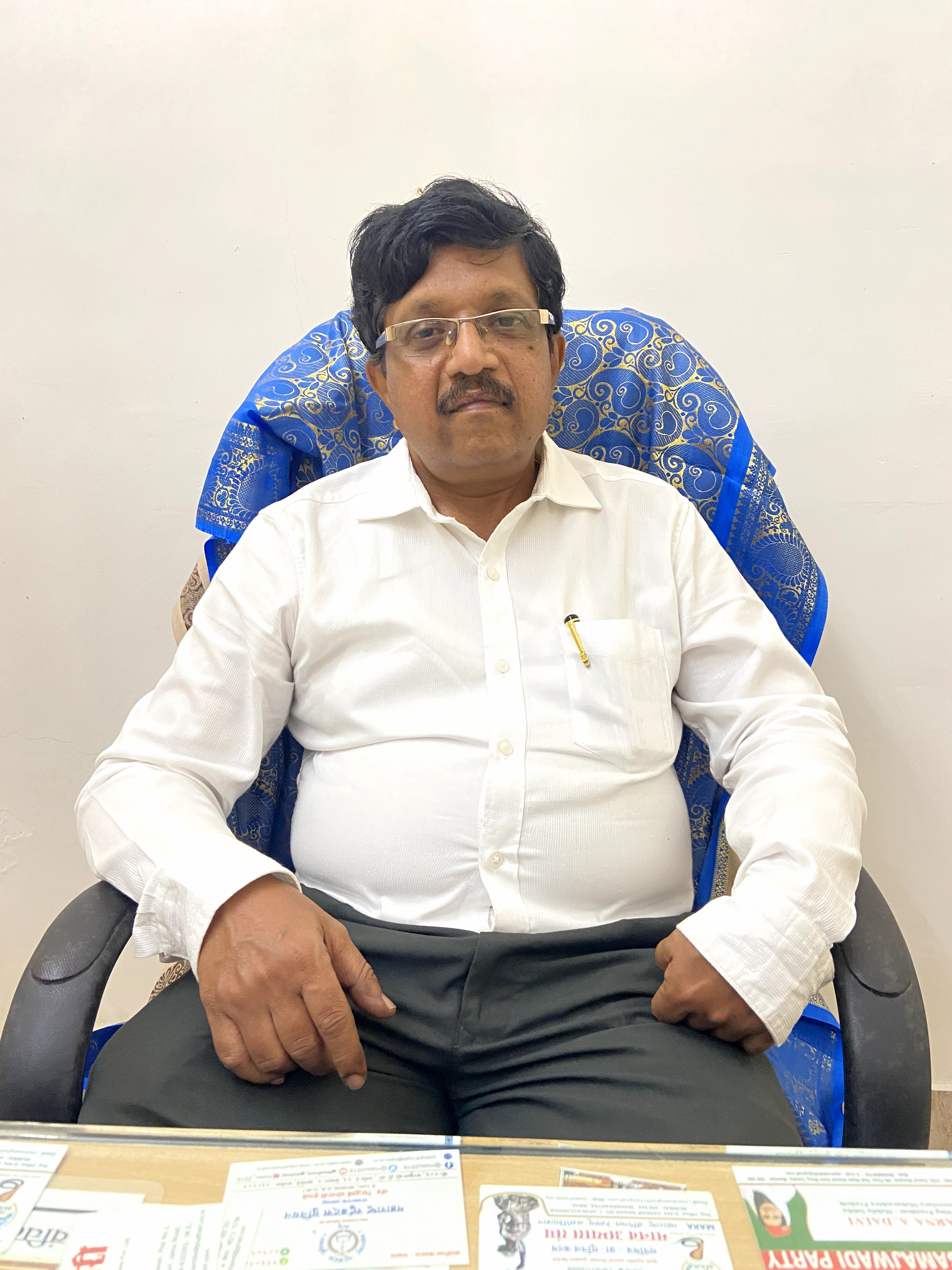
Anandraj Yashwant Ambedkar

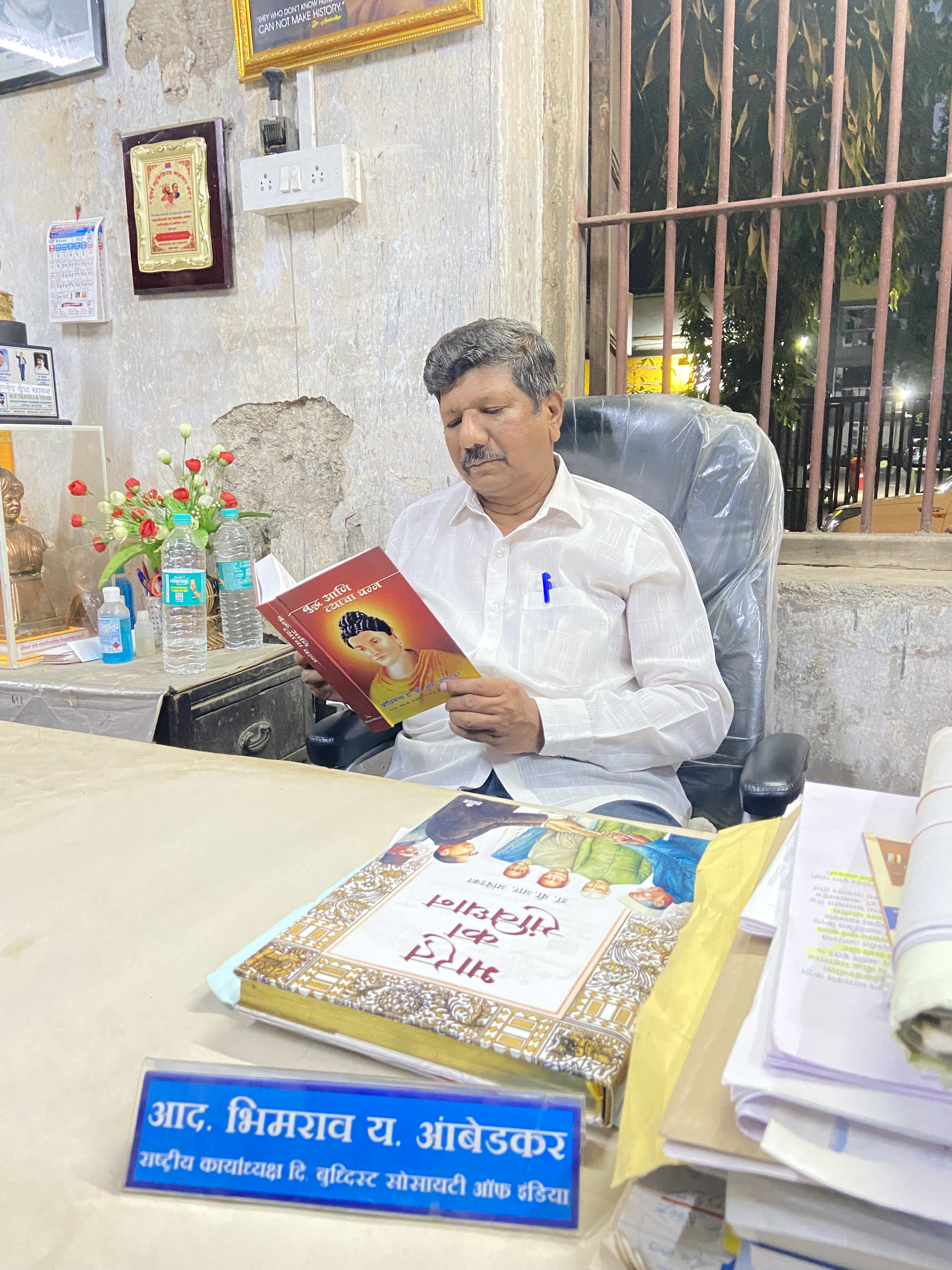
Bhimrao Yashwant Ambedkar

== See also ==
- B. R. Ambedkar
- Political families of Maharashtra
- List of things named after B. R. Ambedkar
