= Jambhul Aakhyan =

Indian folk tale

Jambhul Aakhyan is a popular folk tale from the Indian state of Maharashtra. It describes how Draupadi confesses love for Karna. The tale is not a part of the original Sanskrit epic of Mahabharata

== Synopsis ==
During 13 years of exile, Draupadi once picks a jambhul (jamun) fruit. A rishi or in some versions Krishna in disguise as rishi or Krishna himself stopped Draupadi to eat fruit and alerts her about rishi and his curse. Draupadi asked for help. Krishna tells her that if she can reattach the fruit to the tree, no curse will be placed on her and Pandavas. When she asks how it is possible, Krishna says that if she and her husband reveal their deepest secret, the fruit will attach itself. Then one by one Pandavas reveal their deepest secrets and Draupadi confesses her feelings for Karna and so the fruit was reattached.

== Adaptation ==
Jambhul Akhyan is popularly performed by Indian folk singer Vitthal Umap.
