= Republican Sena =

- Abbreviation: RS
- President: Anandraj Ambedkar
- Founder: Anandraj Ambedkar
- Founded: 21 November 1998
- Ideology: Ambedkarism; Social Equality

The Republican Sena (translation: Republican Army; abbr. RS) is a political party in India. It was founded by Anandraj Ambedkar on 21 November 1998. Anandraj Ambedkar is a son of Yashwant Ambedkar and grandson of B. R. Ambedkar. The party is based on the ideology of B. R. Ambedkar (Ambedkarism), and is primarily based in the state of Maharashtra. Republican Sena's supporters occupied the Indu Mills Compound at Dadar, Mumbai in 2011 to highlight the long-pending demand for the Statue of Equality, the under-construction memorial at the compound dedicated to B. R. Ambedkar. The party has also worked with the Vanchit Bahujan Aaghadi party, headed by Anandraj's elder brother Prakash Yashwant Ambedkar.

On 17 July 2025, the Republican Sena, led by Anandraj Ambedkar, and Shiv Sena, led by Eknath Shinde, formed a political alliance.

== See also ==
- List of political parties in India
- Politics of India
- Politics of Maharashtra
- Prakash Ambedkar
- Vanchit Bahujan Aaghadi
