= Vitthal Umap =

Indian folk singer and social worker (1931–2010)

- Born: 15 July 1931; Sangamner Maharashtra, India
- Died: 27 November 2010 (aged 79); Deekshabhoomi, Nagpur

Vitthal Umap (15 July 1931 – 27 November 2010) was an Indian folk singer, shahir and social worker from Maharashtra state. Umap was an Ambedkarite and Buddhist. To illustrate B. R. Ambedkar's philosophy to the people, he wrote the song-books "Mazi Vani Bhimacharani" and "Mazi Aai Bhimai".

== Early life and career ==
Vitthal Umap, born on 15 July 1931, in a Dalit family in a chawl in Naigaon, central Mumbai, was drawn to the Ambedkar movement from a young age. He started singing at the age of eight. During Umap's childhood, B. R. Ambedkar was actively engaged in social reform movements. As Umap grew older, he contributed to society through folk songs and Padnatya (verse dramas). These forms of artistic expression were utilized as tools for social awareness and mobilization. Umap worked to highlight Maharashtra's neglected folk traditions and traveled across the state to promote them.

He composed music for several films, serials and dramas. He was also a part of popular stage shows Khandobacha Lagin, Gadhwacha Lagna, Jambhool Akhyan and Me Marathi.

Umap had won the first prize at the International Folk Music and Art Festival at Cork, Ireland. His roles in Shyam Benegal’s TV series Bharat Ek Khoj and Jabbar Patel’s film Dr. Babasaheb Ambedkar won him further laurels. He was nominated for the best actor's award for his performance in a Marathi film Tingya.

== Death ==
Vitthal Umap died due to heart attack while performing at a function at Dikshabhoomi, Nagpur, on 27 November 2010. Umap collapsed onstage and was rushed to a private nursing home, where he was declared dead.

== Awards ==
- Sangeet Natak Akademi Puraskar – 2009 (Awarded in 2010) by Sangeet Natak Akademi, Government of India
