= Rambai =

Rambai may refer to:

- Baccaurea motleyana, a type of plant
- Kampong Rambai, a village in Mukim Rambai, Brunei
- Mukim Rambai, a mukim of Brunei
- Sungai Rambai, a mukim of Malaysia
- Seri Rambai, a historical Dutch cannon in Penang, Malaysia

== See also ==
- Ramabai (disambiguation)
- Rambaiyin Kaadhal (disambiguation)
