= Rambaiyin Kaadhal =

Rambaiyin Kaadhal may refer to:

- Rambaiyin Kaadhal (1939 film), an Indian Tamil-language Hindu mythological film
- Rambaiyin Kaadhal (1956 film), an Indian Tamil-language Hindu mythological film

== See also ==
- Rambai (disambiguation)
- Ramabai (disambiguation)
