= Hindu Colony =

Coordinates: 19.020841°N 72.848647°E

Hindu Colony is an old locality situated in the Dadar area of Mumbai, India. The locality falls in between Dadar and Matunga on the east side of the Central Railway Line. Traditionally, the area had been a locality of Maharashtrians, Catholics, Jews and Gujaratis, though Maharashtrians are the highest by numbers.

The buildings were designed in a style which was prevalent in the pre independence era. British styled Buildings with service staircases and glimpses of Victorian architecture can still be seen. Redevelopment has lent a new look to most of the colony.

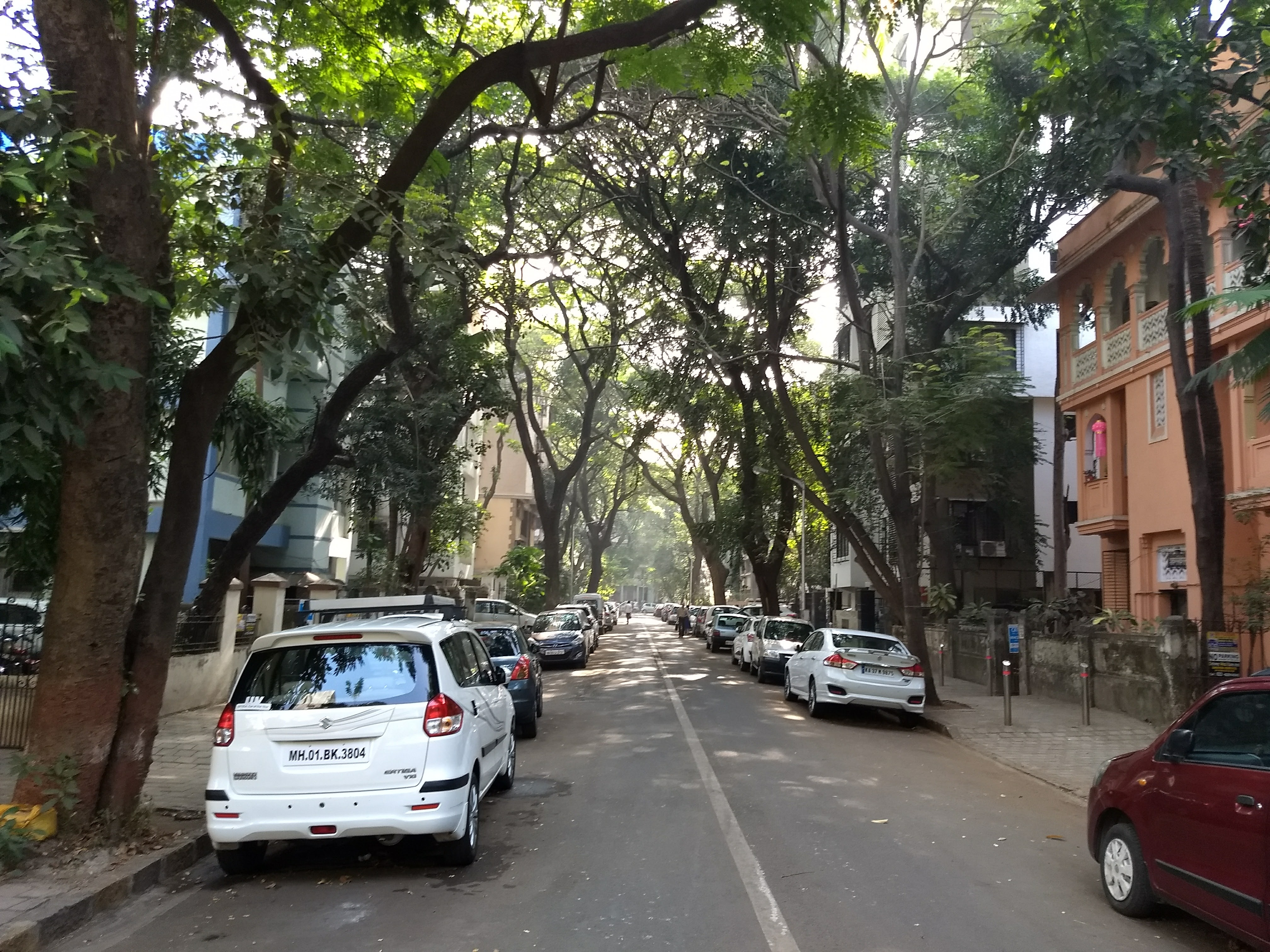

The Colony extends from the Dadar TT Circle, more specifically from the Eastern End of the Tilak Bridge (which connects Dadar East and West) to Ruia College. The Colony is typically designed with roads being identified as Lanes, totaling to 6.

The Dadar T.T. Circle is a traffic convergence area, and an important junction as well as a landmark.

The term T.T. Originates from the tram terminus, which was located here, in the British Era

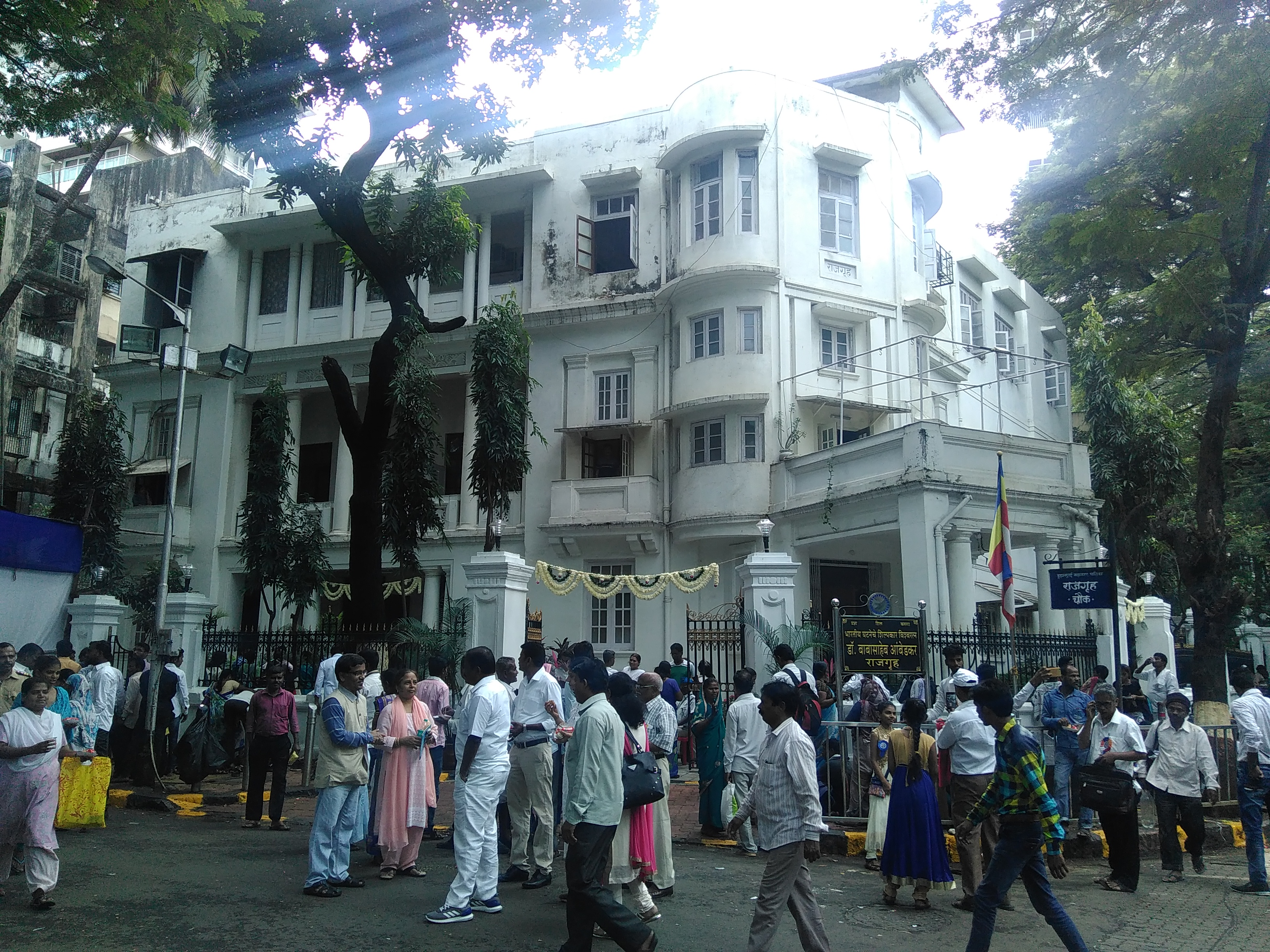
People visit Rajgruha on Ambedkar's Mahaparinirvana day, 6 December 2017

B. R. Ambedkar's home, "Rajgruha", which he built in the 1930s, is in this area. Hemant Karkare, Chief of the Mumbai Anti-Terrorist Squad, also lived in the colony. After he was killed during 2008 Mumbai attacks, his wife continued to stay here.

The colony is in very close proximity of Ramnarayan Ruia College of Arts & Science and Poddar College of Commerce.

The important Dadar railway station is a 5-10 min walk away, as also is the Eastern Express highway (Dr. Bahasaheb Ambekar Road).

Cricketer Dilip Vengsarkar’s childhood home is in the 1st Lane (D V Pradhan Road). Cricketer Sunil Gavaskar lived close to Hindu Colony during his early years

Hindu Colony also has eminent Doctors, like Dr. N Laud, who was part of the team of Drs who operated on ex Prime Minister of India; Shri Atal Bihari Vajpayee. Dr Sandesh Mayekar, a Dentist of Miss India fame, also grew up in Hindu Colony & has his clinic at Dadar T.T.

Three schools, are situated in the colony; The IES English Medium School, Raja Shivaji Vidyalaya (Marathi Medium) & IES’s Gujrati medium school and IES ORION (ICSE)

Residents of this colony celebrate the grand Ganesh Utsav at the Bhagini Samaj ground. The celebrations include many competitive sporting events and renowned Marathi plays being hosted

Hindu Colony being adjacent to Dadar T.T. is in a location with access to the most of Mumbai. Also, several old buildings have been pulled down & reconstruction has given rise to new buildings & High rises.
