= We Also Made History =

Indian book

- Author: Urmila Pawar; Meenakshi Moon
- Translator: Wandana Sonalkar
- Language: English
- Subject: Dalit movement, feminism
- Publication date: 2008
- Publication place: India
- Media type: Print

We Also Made History: Women in the Ambedkarite Movement is a book that explores the role of women in the Dalit movement in India, led by B. R. Ambedkar. Originally written and edited in Marathi by Urmila Pawar and Meenakshi Moon, it was published in 1989. The English translation, done by Wandana Sonalkar, was released in 2008.

== Overview ==
The book is divided into two sections. The first section provides a historical analysis of the participation and role of women in the Ambedkar movement, as well as previous Dalit struggles in the twentieth century. The second part features interviews and brief biographies of 45 Dalit women. These women include Ramabai Ambedkar, Dr. Ambedkar's first wife; Sulochanabai Dongre, who chaired the women's conference at the founding of the All India Scheduled Castes Federation in 1942; and Sakhubai Mohite, who was elected president of the All India Buddhist Women's Association in 1956 after joining Ambedkar in converting to Buddhism as a protest against the Hindu caste system.

== Reception ==
The book is described as "a treasure to Dalit and Dalit feminist studies", shedding light on critical issues in "feminist historiography without resorting to abstract theoretical notions."
