= Prakash Yashwant Ambedkar =

Indian politician and social activist

Prakash Ambedkar
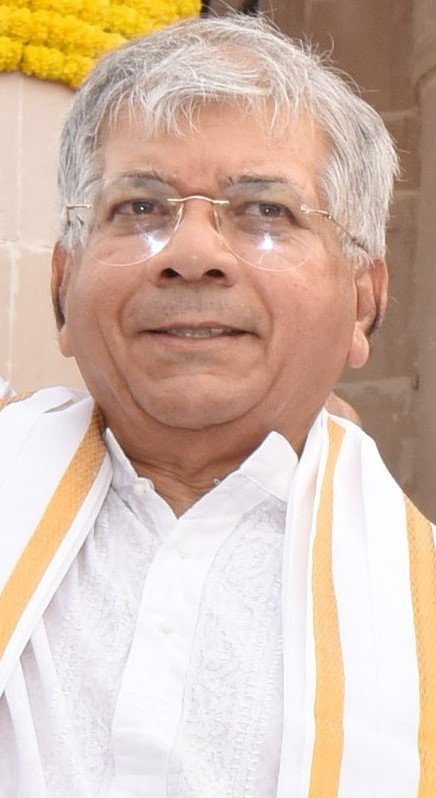

Member of Parliament, Lok Sabha
- In office 10 March 1998 – 18 May 2004
- Preceded by: Pandurang Pundalik Fundkar
- Succeeded by: Sanjay Shamrao Dhotre
- Constituency: Akola

Member of Parliament, Rajya Sabha
- In office 18 September 1990 – 17 September 1996
- Constituency: Maharashtra

Personal details
- Born: 10 May 1954 (age 72) Bombay, Bombay State, India
- Party: Vanchit Bahujan Aghadi (since 2019)
- Spouse: Anjali Ambedkar (m. 1993)
- Children: Sujat Ambedkar (son)
- Parents: Yashwant Ambedkar; Meera Ambedkar
- Relatives: See Ambedkar family
- Education: Bachelor of Arts; Bachelor of Laws
- Alma mater: St. Stanislaus High School; Siddharth College of Law, Mumbai
- Profession: Advocate, Politician, Social worker
- Website: PrakashAmbedkar on Facebook
- Nickname: Balasaheb Ambedkar

Prakash Yashwant Ambedkar (born 10 May 1954), popularly known as Balasaheb Ambedkar, is an Indian politician, writer and lawyer. He is the president of Vanchit Bahujan Agadi political party. He is a three-time Member of Parliament. He was a member of the 12th and 13th Lok Sabha of India representing the Lok Sabha constituency of Akola, Maharashtra. He has served in both houses of the Indian Parliament.

== Personal life ==
Prakash Ambedkar is the grandson of Dr. B. R. Ambedkar, and Ramabai. His father's name is Y. B. Ambedkar (nicknamed "Bhaiyasaheb"), and his mother's name is Meera. He is a Navayana Buddhist. He has two younger brothers B. Y. Ambedkar and A. Y. Ambedkar and a sister Ramabai who is married to Anand Teltumbde. Prakash Ambedkar is married to Anjali Maydeo and they have a son named Sujat.

== Activities ==
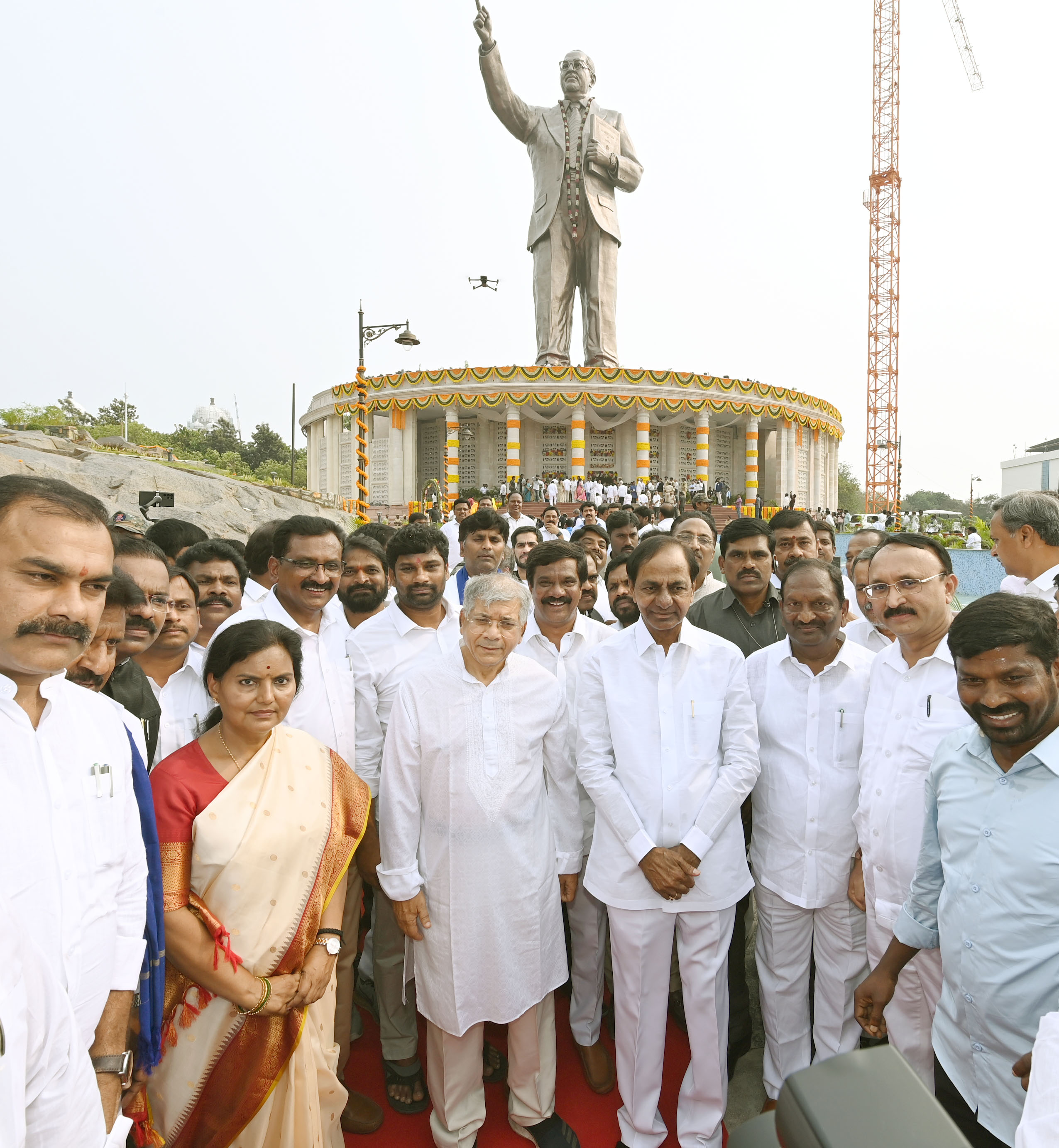
CM KCR, Prakash Ambedkar in front of 125 feet Ambedkar Statue in Hyderabad

Prakash Ambedkar has organised mass rallies at the national level, including in response to the Riddles march case, Rohith Vemula suicide case, Ambedkar Bhavan demolition case, Una flogging incident and 2018 Bhima Koregaon violence case.

Prakash Ambedkar is noted for having designed the political strategy known as the Akola Pattern of political organising to appeal to all excluded masses, including Dalits and Muslims. The Akola Pattern is named after the Akola district of Maharashtra where Prakash Ambedkar's political party is based.

In 2017, together with his son Sujat, Prakash Ambedkar relaunched Prabuddh Bharat (Enlightened India), the newspaper his grandfather Dr. B. R. Ambedkar founded in 1956. Prakash Ambedkar has also been working to archive editions of the original Prabuddh Bharat from the 1950s, after copies were lost in the controversial demolition of the Buddha Bhushan printing press in 2016.

Prakash Ambedkar has also worked to preserve his grandfather's legacy as architect of the Indian Constitution and has been quoted as saying "The country will survive only if the Constitution survives."

Prakash Ambedkar attracted controversy and criticism after he threatened the Times Now anchor Anand Narsimhan to physically harm the anchor by saying that he would think what he could do to him if the governance gets changed.

In June 2023, Ambedkar defended the historical significance of Mughal emperor Aurangzeb's 50-year rule, urging people not to resort to abuse. Ambedkar made this statement while visiting the Aurangzeb memorial in Khuldabad, Aurangabad District. His visit coincided with arrests and clashes in the state related to social media posts praising Aurangzeb. Ambedkar questioned the notion of erasing history and asked, "What's wrong with visiting the Aurangzeb memorial? He was a Mughal emperor who ruled here for 50 years."
