= Yashwant Ambedkar =

Indian activist, newspaper editor, politician (1912–1977)

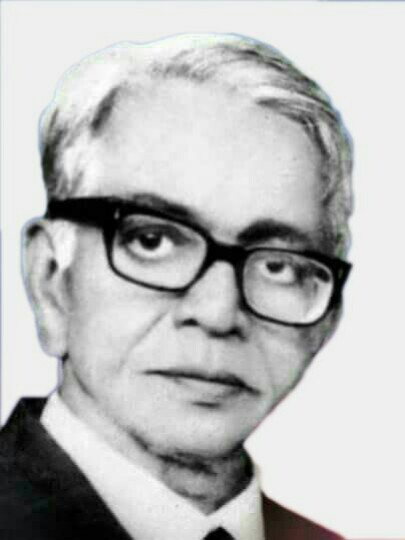
- Ambedkar in 1970

2nd president of the Buddhist Society of India
- In office 27 June 1957 – 17 September 1977
- Preceded by: B. R. Ambedkar
- Succeeded by: Meera Ambedkar

Member of Maharashtra Legislative Council
- In office 1960 – 1966

Editor of Janata
- In office 1942 – 1956

Editor of Prabuddha Bharat
- In office 1956 – 1977

Personal details
- Born: 12 December 1912 Bombay, Bombay Presidency, British India (present day Mumbai, Maharashtra, India)
- Died: 17 September 1977 (aged 64) Bombay, Maharashtra, India
- Resting place: Chaitya Bhoomi
- Party: Scheduled Caste Federation; Republican Party of India
- Spouse: Meera Ambedkar
- Children: 4 (including Prakash Ambedkar and Anandraj Ambedkar)
- Parents: B. R. Ambedkar (father); Ramabai Ambedkar (mother)
- Relatives: Ambedkar family
- Profession: Newspaper editor; Politician; Buddhist activist; Social worker
- Nickname: Bhaiyasaheb Ambedkar

Yashwant Bhimrao Ambedkar (Note: There are numerous variant spellings of Ambedkar's name. These include Yashwant, Yashawant, Yashwantrao, and, Yashawantrao.) (12 December 1912 – 17 September 1977), also known as Bhaiyasaheb Ambedkar, was an Indian socio-religious activist, newspaper editor, politician, and activist of Ambedkarite Buddhist movement. He was the first and only surviving child of Ramabai Ambedkar and B. R. Ambedkar, Indian polymath, human rights activist, and the first law minister of India. Yashwant devoted his life to Buddhism after the demise of his father and kept pace his father's struggle for social equality. He tried to keep the Ambedkarite community united.

After his father died in 1956, he became the second president of the Buddhist Society of India and continued his father's struggle. In 1968, he organized an All India Buddhist Conference. After his death, his wife Mira became the president of the Buddhist Society of India. He had four children, including Prakash Yashwant Ambedkar.

He had been the editor of the "Janata" newspaper since 1942.

== Personal life ==
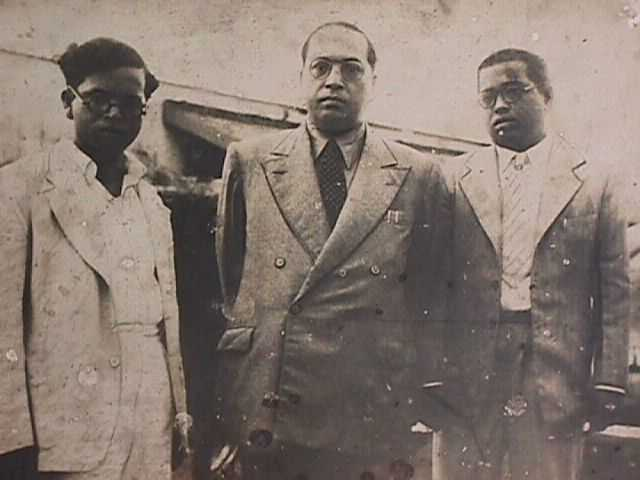
Dr. Dr. B. R. Ambedkar with his son Yashwant (left) and Nephew Mukund (right)

Yashwant Ambedkar, born on 12 December 1912 in Bombay, married Meera Ambedkar in a Buddhist manner on 19 April 1953. They have four children, which are Prakash, Ramā, Bhimrao and Anandraj. His only daughter Ramā is married to Anand Teltumbde.

== Religious work ==
On 14 October 1956, he converted to Navayana Buddhism. After the death of his father, Dr. B. R. Ambedkar on 6 December 1956, he became the second president of the Buddhist Society of India. This position he held until his death (1956–1977). In 1958, he represented India at the World Buddhist Conference in Bangkok, Thailand.

He erected many Buddhist temples, and monuments of Dr. B. R. Ambedkar. On 2 August 1958, at Bhimnagar in Pune, he erected a full-sized bronze statue of Dr. B. R. Ambedkar.

Dr. B. R. Ambedkar's tomb Chaitya Bhoomi memorial work was completed by Yashwant Ambedkar's efforts.

He represented India at the World Buddhist Conference in Sri Lanka in 1972.

== Political work ==
Yashwant Ambedkar was the co-founder of the Republican Party of India, which has its roots in the Scheduled Castes Federation led by B. R. Ambedkar. On 30 September 1956, B. R. Ambedkar announced the establishment of the "Republican Party of India" by dismissing the "Scheduled Castes Federation", but before the formation of the party, he died on 6 December 1956. After that, his followers and activists planned to form this party. A meeting of the Presidency was held in Nagpur on 1 October 1957 to establish the party. At this meeting, N. Sivaraj, Yashwant Ambedkar, P. T. Borale, A. G. Pawar, Datta Katti, Dadasaheb Rupwate were present. The Republican Party of India was formed on 3 October 1957. N. Sivaraj was elected as the President of the party.

He was a member of the Maharashtra Legislative Council from 1960 to 1966.

RPI President N. Sivaraj elected Ambedkar as the Mumbai State President of RPI in 1964. RPI started agitation for landless people in 1959.

== Death ==
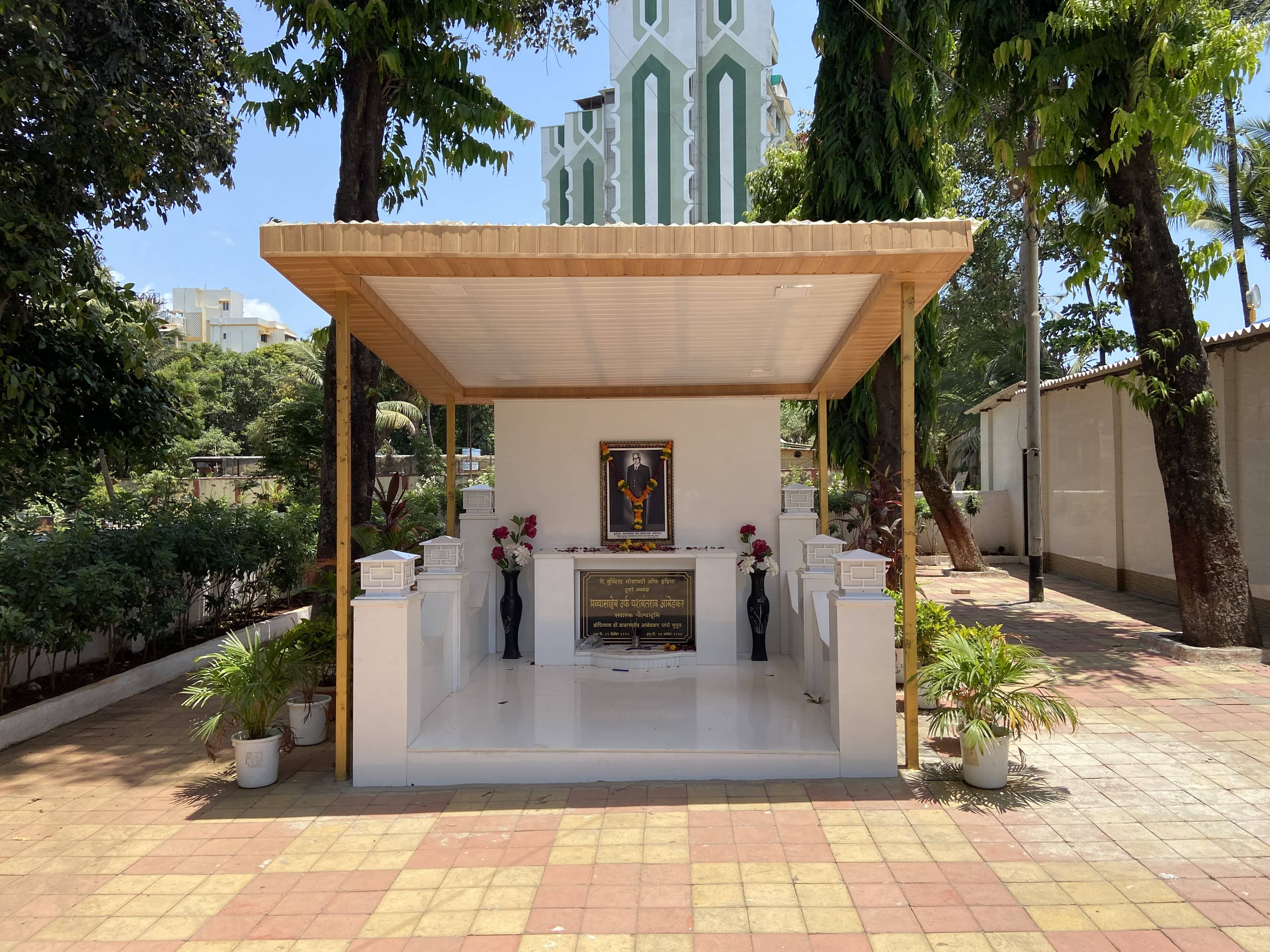
Resting Place Of Yashwant Bhimrao Ambedkar Chaitya Bhoomi.

He died on 17 September 1977. More than one million people attended his funeral. He was cremated in a Buddhist manner in Mumbai at the Dadar Cemetery (next to the Chaityabhoomi Stupa).

== Books on Ambedkar ==
- "Suryaputra Yashwantrao Ambedkar" (The son of sun: Yashwant Ambedkar) — writer: Phulchandra Khobragade; Sanket Prakashan, Nagpur, 2014
- "Loknete Bhaiyasaheb Ambedkar" (The people's leader: Bhaiyasaheb Ambedkar) — writer: Prakash Janjal, Ramai Prakashan, 2019

== See also ==
- Savita Ambedkar
- Ambedkar family
