= Vanand, Maharashtra =

Village in Maharashtra

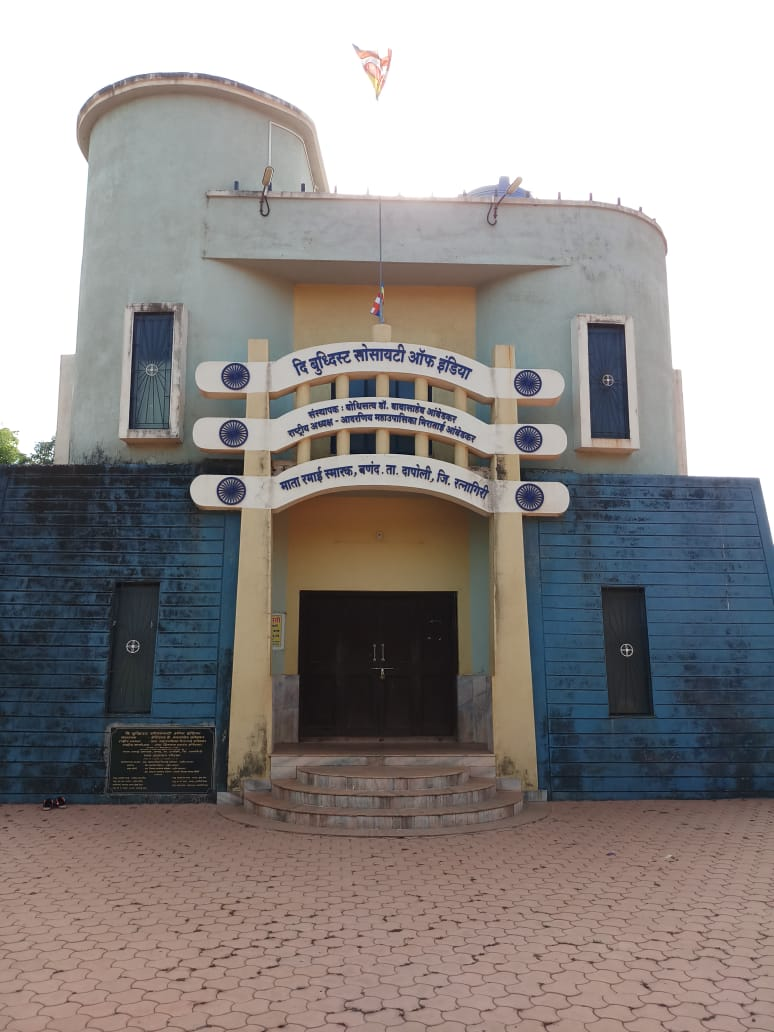
Maata Ramai Smarak, Vanand

Vanand is a small village in Ratnagiri district, Maharashtra state in Western India. The 2011 Census of India recorded a total of 812 residents in the village. Vanand's geographical area is 419 hectares (1,040 acres). this village is the birthplace of Ramabai Ambedkar, wife of Dr. Babasaheb Ambedkar.
