= Ramabai Bhimrao Ambedkar (film) =

2011 Indian Marathi-language film by Prakash Jadhav

- movie poster
- Directed by: Prakash Jadhav
- Screenplay by: Prakash Jadhav; Anil Baindur
- Story by: Sadashiv Chavhan
- Produced by: Prakash Jadhav
- Starring: Nisha Parulekar; Ganesh Jethe; Dashrath Hatiskar; Snehal Velankar
- Cinematography: Trilok Chaudhari
- Edited by: Prakash Jadhav; Anant Dharmadhiari
- Music by: Dev Chavhan
- Release date: 7 January 2011
- Running time: 123 minutes
- Country: India
- Language: Marathi

Ramabai Bhimrao Ambedkar is a 2011 Indian biographical film in Marathi language, based on the life of Ramabai Ambedkar also known as Ramai (mother Rama) wife of Dr. Babasaheb Ambedkar. Despite all the hardships, Rambai kept her husband motivated and stood like a rock behind her husband's mission of uplifting the underprivileged classes of the country. This is first film made on Ramabai. The film is directed by Prakash Jadhav and featured Nisha Parulekar, Ganesh Jethe and Dashrath Hatiskar as lead characters. Other popular actors who were roped in for Ramabai Bhimrao Ambedkar (Ramai) are Snehal Velankar and Anil Sutar. The film was released on 7 January 2011.

== Cast ==
- Anil Sutar
- Anuya Bam
- Amey Potkar
- R.G. Pawar
- Komal Aapke
- Khushi Ravrane
- Gajanan Rande
- Ganesh Jethe
- Jayant Yadav
- Datta Borkar
- Datta Redkar
- Dashrath Ragankar
- Vilas Jadhav
- Dashrath Hrutiskar
- Dipjyoti
- Nandkumar Newalkar
- Nimesh Chaudhari
- Nisha Parulekar
- Netra Paradkar
- Paranjpe
- Pooja Joshi
- Prathmesh Pradip
- Pradip Bharankar
- Prabhakar More
- Fadke Guruji

=== Child artists ===
- Kirti Sheregar
- Manali Chandradev
- Manoj Takne
- Mahesh Chavhan
- Mahesh Thakur
- Milind Chakradev
- Radheya Pandit
- Rohit Rode
- Vikrant Ukarde
- Vimal Ghatkar
- Vilas Jadhav
- Shankar Malekar
- Sharayu
- Shailendra Chavhan
- Sanket Pawar
- Satish Mule
- Sadashiv Chavhan
- Sandesh Utekar
- Sayli Vilankar
- Sahil Kamble
- Sonali Mule
- Snehal Vilankar

== Soundtrack ==
1. "Barrister Banuni Saheb" – Nandesh Upam
2. "Daridryachi Jhal" – Shakuntla Jhadhav
3. "Ghalun Pani Tulsila" – Shakuntla Jhadhav
4. "Rup Manohar" – Shakuntla Jhadhav
5. "Tujhyasang Sansar" – Nandesh Upam
6. "Tulas Tu Majhi" – Shakuntla Jhadhav

== See also ==
- Ramabai (film) - a 2016 Kannada film on the same topic
- Dr. Babasaheb Ambedkar (film) - a 2000 English feature film on Dr. Ambedkar
