= Savita Ambedkar =

Indian social activist and doctor

Savita Ambedkar MBBS
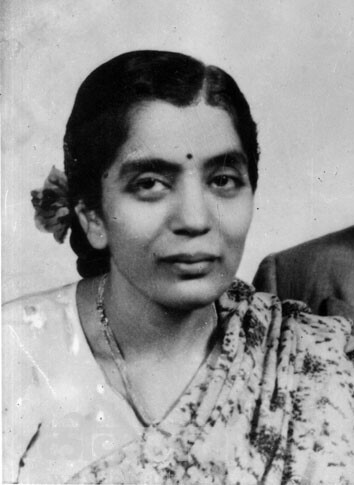
- Dr Savita Ambedkar
- Born: Sharada Krishnarao Kabir; 27 January 1909; Dadar, Bombay Presidency, British India (now in Maharashtra, India)
- Died: 29 May 2003 (aged 94); Mumbai, Maharashtra, India
- Other names: Mai (mother), Maisaheb Ambedkar
- Education: Grant Medical College, Mumbai
- Occupations: social activist, doctor
- Known for: Social activism
- Notable work: Dr. Ambedkaranchya Sahawasat
- Movement: Dalit Buddhist movement
- Spouse: B. R. Ambedkar (m. 1948; died 1956)
- Relatives: Ambedkar family

Savita Bhimrao Ambedkar (née Kabir; 27 January 1909 – 29 May 2003) was an Indian physician, and social activist. In 1948, she married B. R. Ambedkar, the prime architect of the Constitution of India and Dalit icon. In 1956, both Savita and Bhimrao converted from Hinduism to Buddhism.

Savita Ambedkar helped her husband by caring for his health. B. R. Ambedkar credited her for this in the preface of his book The Buddha and His Dhamma. Ramabai Ambedkar, B. R. Ambedkar's first wife had died in 1935.

== Early life and education ==
Ambedkar was born Sharada Krishnarao Kabir on 27 January 1909 in Bombay in a Marathi Saraswat Brahmin family. Her mother's name was Janaki and her father's name was Krishnarao Vinayak Kabir. Her family hailed from the Dorle village, located in Ratnagiri Tehasil of Ratnagiri district, Maharashtra. Later, her father migrated from Ratnagiri to Bombay. On the Sir Rao Bahadur S. K. Bole Road, near the "Kabootar Khana" (pigeon house) in Dadar West, the Kabir family had rented a house in Sahru's house in Matruchaya.

Savita's early education was in Pune. In 1937, she completed her MBBS degree from Grant Medical College, Bombay. When her studies were completed, she was appointed as a first-class medical officer in a hospital in Gujarat. However, after some months of illness, she left her job and returned home. Six of her eight siblings had inter-caste marriages. At that time, it was against the societal norms of India. Savita said, "Our family did not oppose inter-caste marriages, because the whole family was educated and progressive."

== Career and meeting with Ambedkar ==
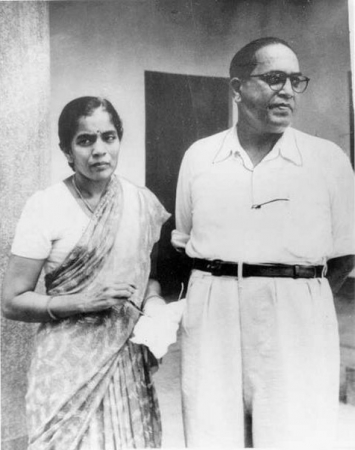
Maisaheb and Babasaheb

Sharada Kabir was introduced to B. R. Ambedkar through S. M. Rao, a doctor who lived in Bombay's Vile Parle and had close links with B. R. Ambedkar. B.R. Ambedkar was then the Labor Minister in the Viceroy's Executive Council. They talked about the empowerment of women and Buddhist philosophy.

They would meet again in the consultation room of Dr. Mavalankar. In 1947, the work of writing the Constitution of India had taken a toll on Dr. Ambedkar's health. He was diagnosed with diabetes and high blood pressure. While he was under medical treatment, Sharada and Ambedkar wrote to each other. They were both interested in literature, society and religion. Because of his deteriorating health, Ambedkar was advised to employ a carer. In a letter addressed to Bhaurao Gaikwad dated 16 March 1948, Ambedkar wrote that he feared hiring a female nurse might cause a scandal. After the death of Yashwant's mother (Ramabai), he had decided not to marry. His health led him to change his mind.

== Marriage ==
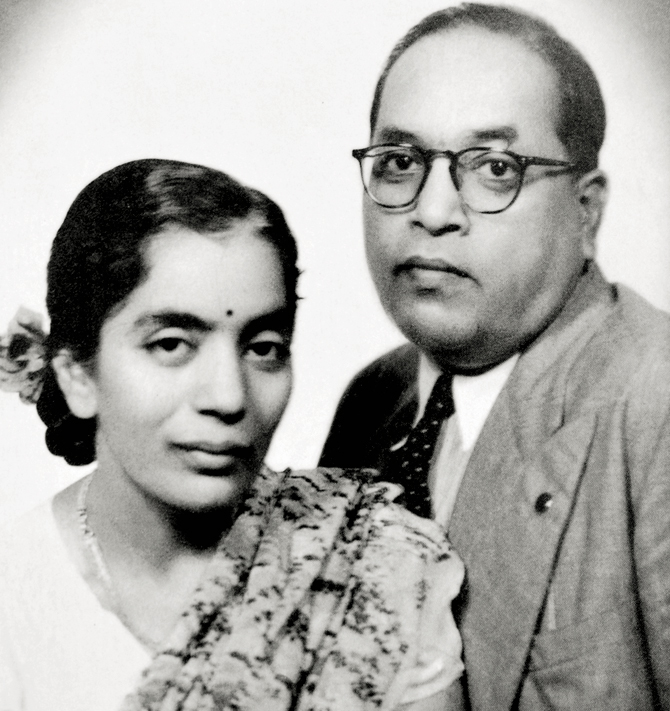
Savita and B.R. Ambedkar in 1948

On 15 April 1948 Sharda Kabir married Ambedkar, as a Civil Marriage. She was 39 and he was 57. After their marriage, she was called "Mai" (mother) by his followers. After marriage Sharda adopted the name 'Savita', but Ambedkar used to call her "Shārū", a form of "Shāradā". Some of the public and Ambedkar's family were angry about the marriage.

After marriage, Ambedkar's health continued to get worse. Savita Ambedkar continued looking after him until his death. Ambedkar mentioned the help he received from her in The Buddha and His Dhamma. In this preface, he says that Savita Ambedkar increased his life by 8–10 years. After Ambedkar's death, his associates and followers removed this passage. The Bengali Buddhist author Bhagwan Das published the preface as a "rare preface".

== Conversion to Buddhism ==
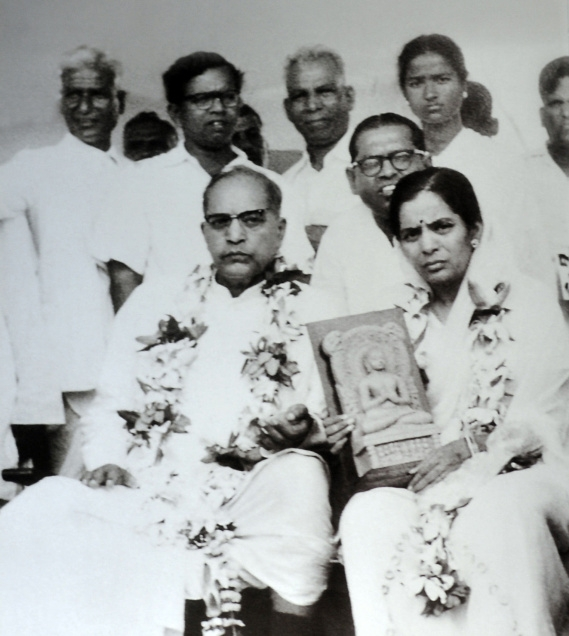
Ambedkar with his wife, holding a statue of the Buddha, during the Dhamma Diksha ceremony in Nagpur on 14 October 1956

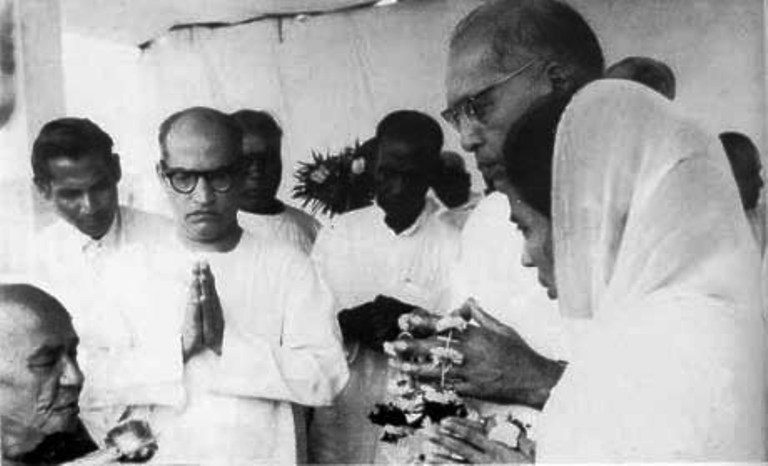
Ambedkar receiving the Five Precepts from Mahasthavir Chandramani on 14 October 1956. In the photograph (from right to left): Savita Ambedkar, B. R. Ambedkar, Wali Sinha and Bhikkhu Chandramani.

On Ashok Vijaya Dashami (the day on which Buddhism was accepted by Emperor Ashoka the Great), 14 October 1956, Ambedkar accepted Buddhism along with her husband in Deekshabhoomi, Nagpur. She was given the initiation of Buddha's Dhamma by the Burmese Bhikkhu Mahastavir Chandramani giving Three Jewels and Five precepts. After this, B. R. Ambedkar himself initiated Buddhism by giving 500,000 followers of Three Jewels, Five precepts and twenty-two pledges. Savita Ambedkar became the first woman to accept Buddhism in this conversion movement.

== Allegations and contradictions ==
Many people from Delhi came to meet B. R. Ambedkar at 26 Alipur Road, where the couple lived. Only a few managed to see him during his sickness. Savita Ambedkar had dual obligations while taking care of him, in addition to being a doctor.

After the death of Babasaheb Ambedkar in December 1956, some Ambedkarites blamed Savita Ambedkar for killing him. They separated her from the Ambedkarite movement by describing her as a Brahmin. She moved to his farmhouse in Mehrauli in Delhi, and remained in Delhi until 1972. The then Prime Minister Jawaharlal Nehru formed a committee to investigate the matter, and that committee released her from the charges after investigation.

== Repatriation with the Dalit movement ==
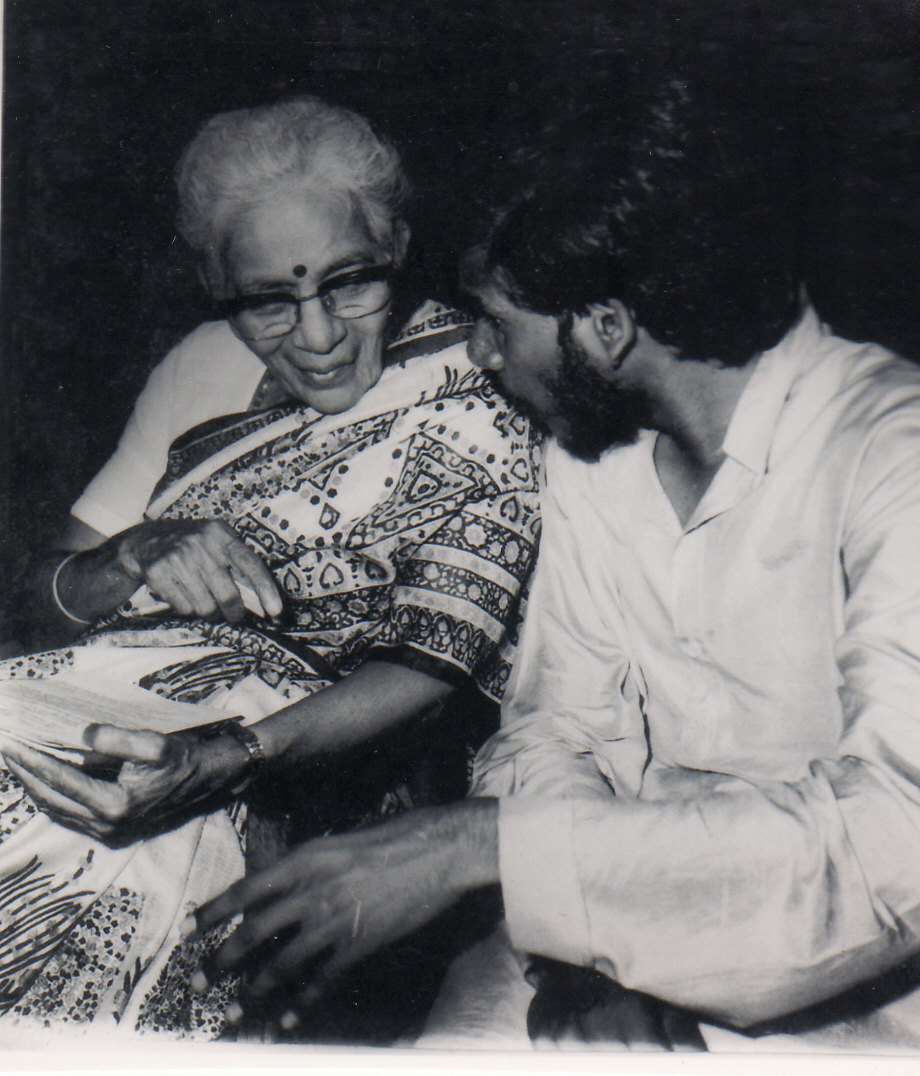
Ambedkar with Arun Krushnaji Kamble,

Republican Party of India leader Ramdas Athavale and Gangadhar Gade brought her back to the mainstream Ambedkarite movement. The young activists of Dalit Panthers movement treated Savita Ambedkar with respect and called her Mai, "mother". She played an important role in the controversy about Ambedkar's book Riddles in Hinduism. This earned her respect and resolved the misunderstanding of Dalits. Later on, she was separated from him as she grew older.

Babasaheb Ambedkar was given the 'Bharat Ratna', the highest civilian award, and it was accepted by Savita Ambedkar from the then President Ramaswamy Venkataraman on 14 April 1990, the centenary of his birth.

== Death ==
Savita Ambedkar lived alone after her husband's death. Later on, she joined the Dalit Buddhist movement. She died on 29 May 2003 at the age of 94 at J.J. Hospital in Mumbai.

== Writings ==
She wrote an autobiography in Marathi, titled "Dr. Ambedkaranchya Sahwasat" (English: In companionship with Dr. Ambedkar). She also contributed to the film Dr. Babasaheb Ambedkar, and was played in it by Mrinal Kulkarni.

== See also ==
- Ramabai Ambedkar
- Ambedkar family
- Yashwant Ambedkar
