= Chaitya Bhoomi =

Resting place of Babasaheb Ambedkar

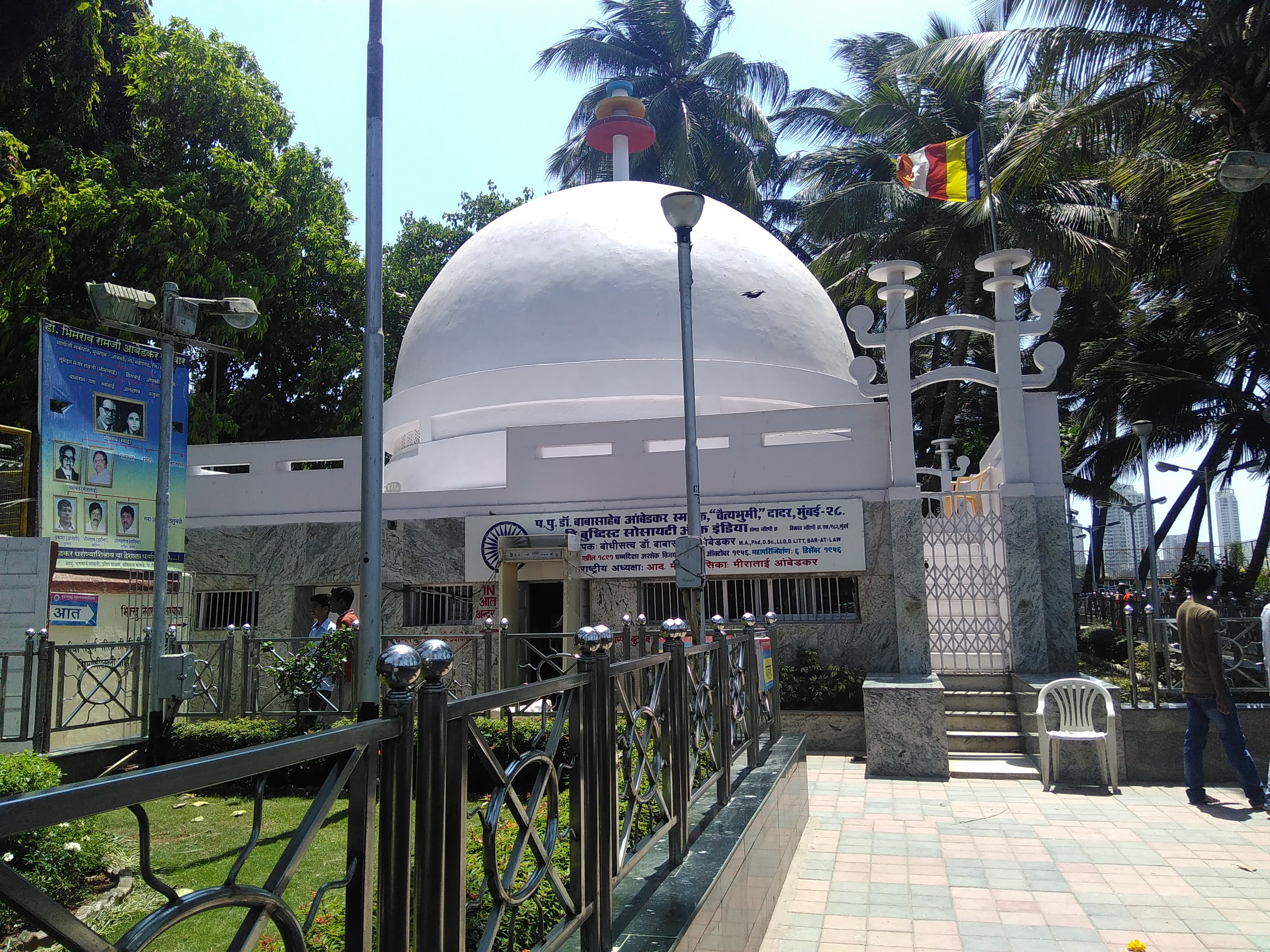
- Chaitya Bhoomi Stupa
- Interactive map of Chaitya Bhoomi
- Location: Dadar, Mumbai, Maharashtra
- Coordinates: 19°01′30″N 72°50′02″E
- Type: Stupa
- Opening date: 5 December 1971
- Dedicated to: B. R. Ambedkar

Chaitya Bhoomi, also written as Chaityabhoomi (IAST: Caityabhūmī, Officially: Dr. Babasaheb Ambedkar Chaityabhoomi Memorial) is a Buddhist chaitya and the cremation place of B. R. Ambedkar, the architect of the Indian Constitution and the revived Buddhism in India. It is situated beside Dadar Chowpatty (beach), Mumbai, Maharashtra, India. Chaitya Bhoomi is a revered place of pilgrimage for Ambedkar's followers, who visit in millions annually on his death anniversary (Mahaparinirvan Diwas) on 6 December.

The Chief Minister of Maharashtra, the Governor, the Minister, and many other politicians pay tribute to Ambedkar every year on 6 December at Chaitya Bhoomi. Narendra Modi, the Prime Minister of India, has also visited. Chaitya Bhoomi hosts a memorial to Ambedkar and has been graded an A-class tourism and pilgrimage site by the Government of Maharashtra.

== Structural details ==
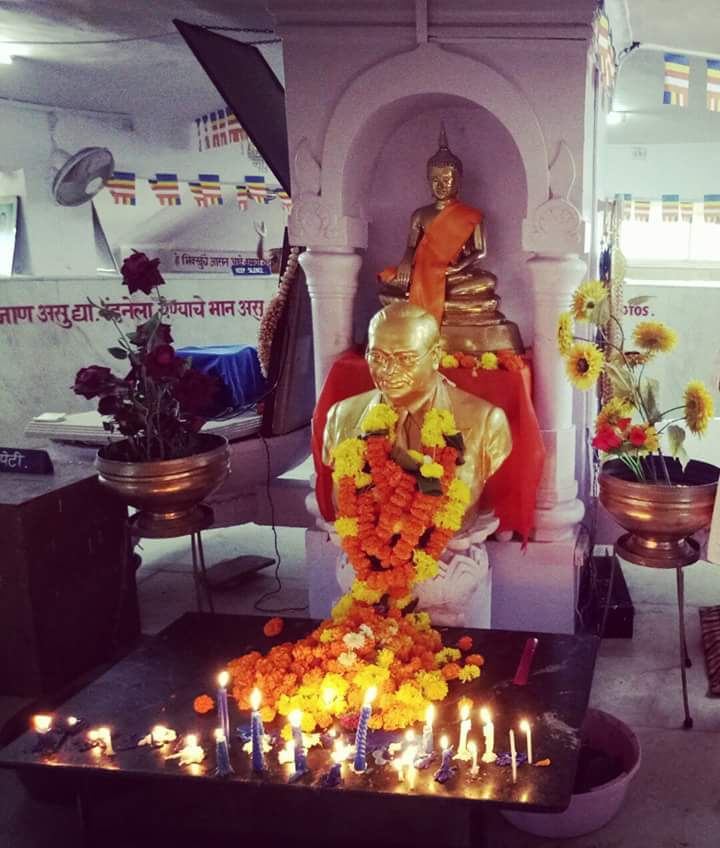
The Buddha and Babasaheb Ambedkar inside Chaitya Bhoomi Stupa

The structure is square in shape, with a small dome divided into ground and mezzanine floors. In the square-shaped structure, is a circular wall about 1.5 metres in height. In the circular area are placed the bust of Ambedkar and a statue of Gautam Buddha. The circular wall has two entrances and is furnished with marble flooring. On the mezzanine floor there is a Stupa, besides the resting place for Bhikkhus. The main entrance gate of the Chaitya Bhoomi is replica of the Gate of the Stupa of Sanchi while inside a replica of Ashoka Pillar is made.

The Chaitya Bhoomi was inaugurated by Meerabai Yashvant Ambedkar, the daughter-in-law of B. R. Ambedkar, on 5 December 1971. Here, the relics of Ambedkar are enshrined. In 2012, the Central Government, led by Prime Minister Manmohan Singh, cleared the transfer of Indu Mills land to the Maharashtra Government for constructing a memorial.

== Mahaparinirvan Din ==
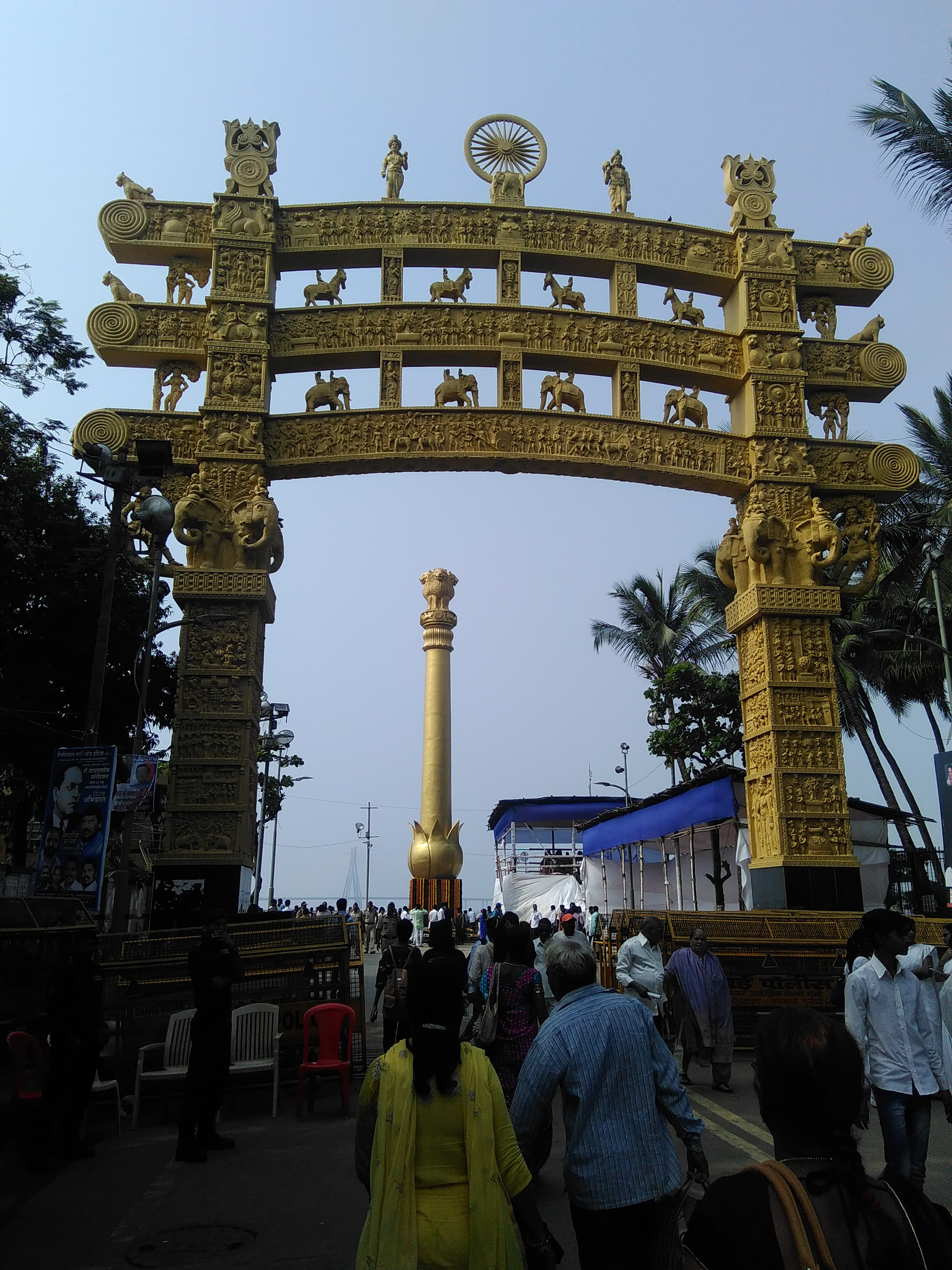
Chaitya Bhoomi gate and Ashoka pillar

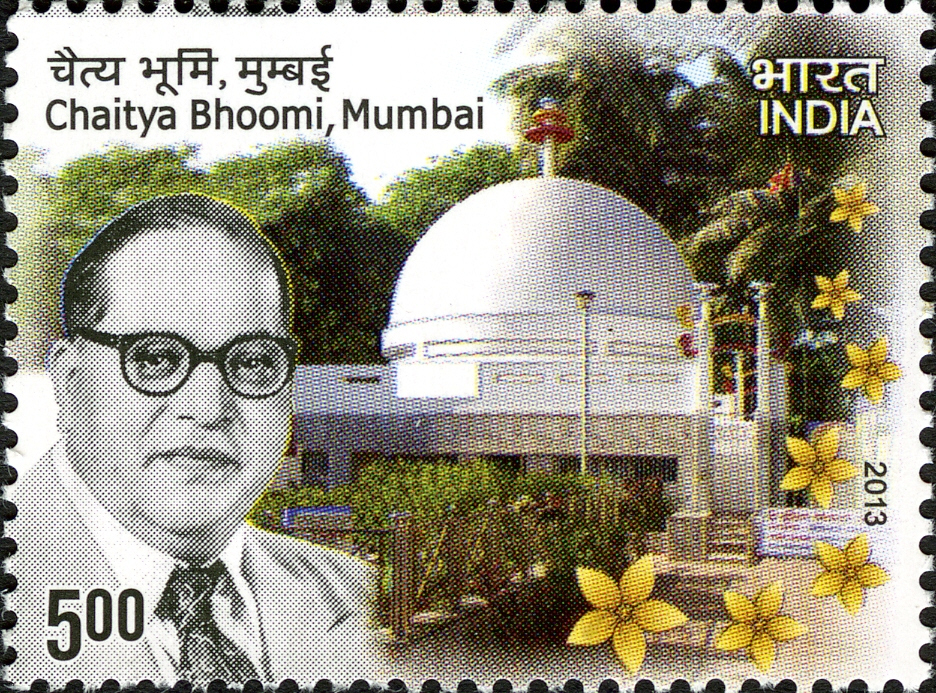
Ambedkar and Chaitya Bhoomi on a 2013 postage stamp of India

Ambedkar's death anniversary (6 December) is observed as Mahaparinirvan Din. Millions of people across India throng Chaitya Bhoomi to pay homage to him.

== Gallery ==
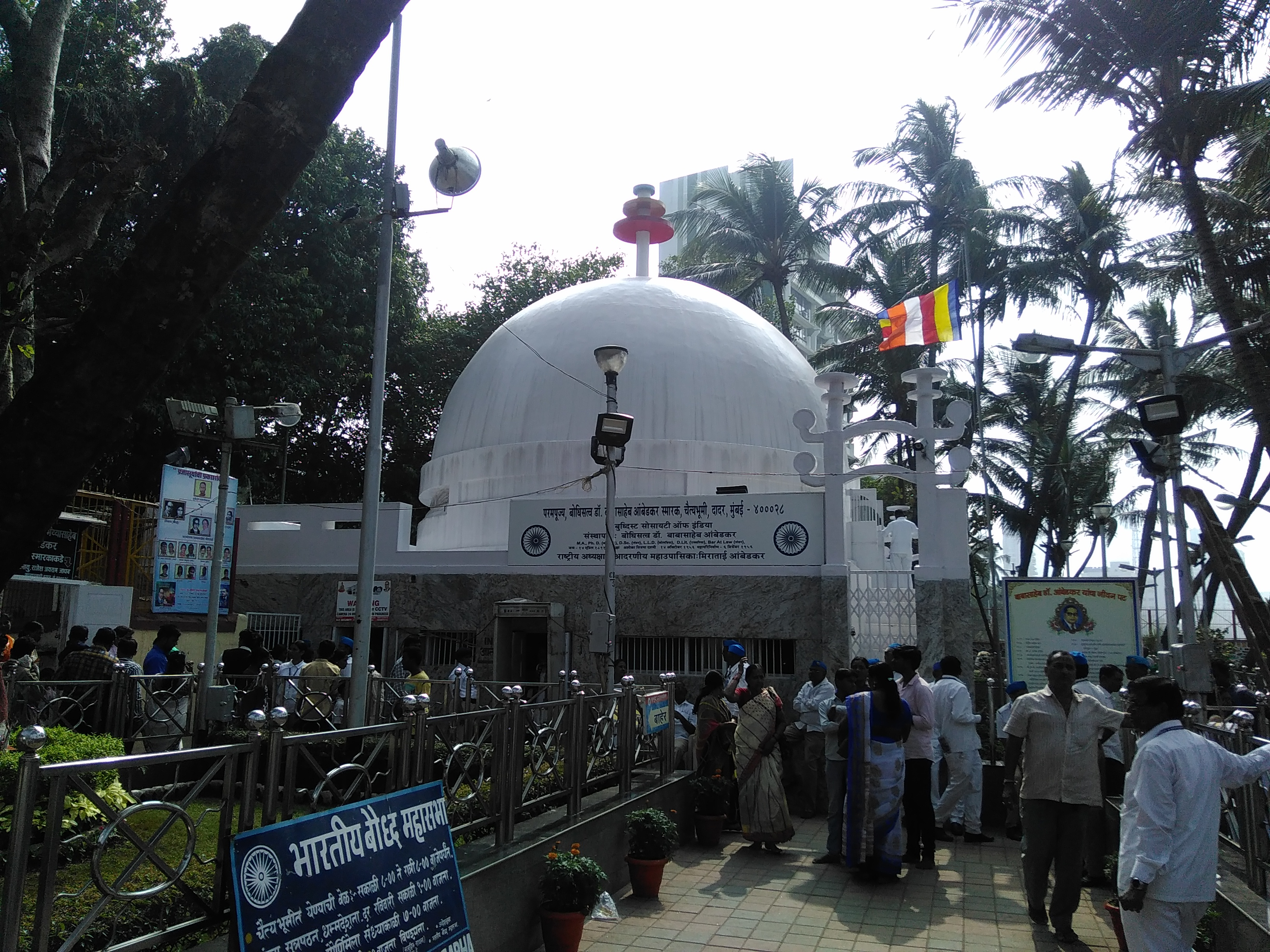
Chaitya Bhoomi

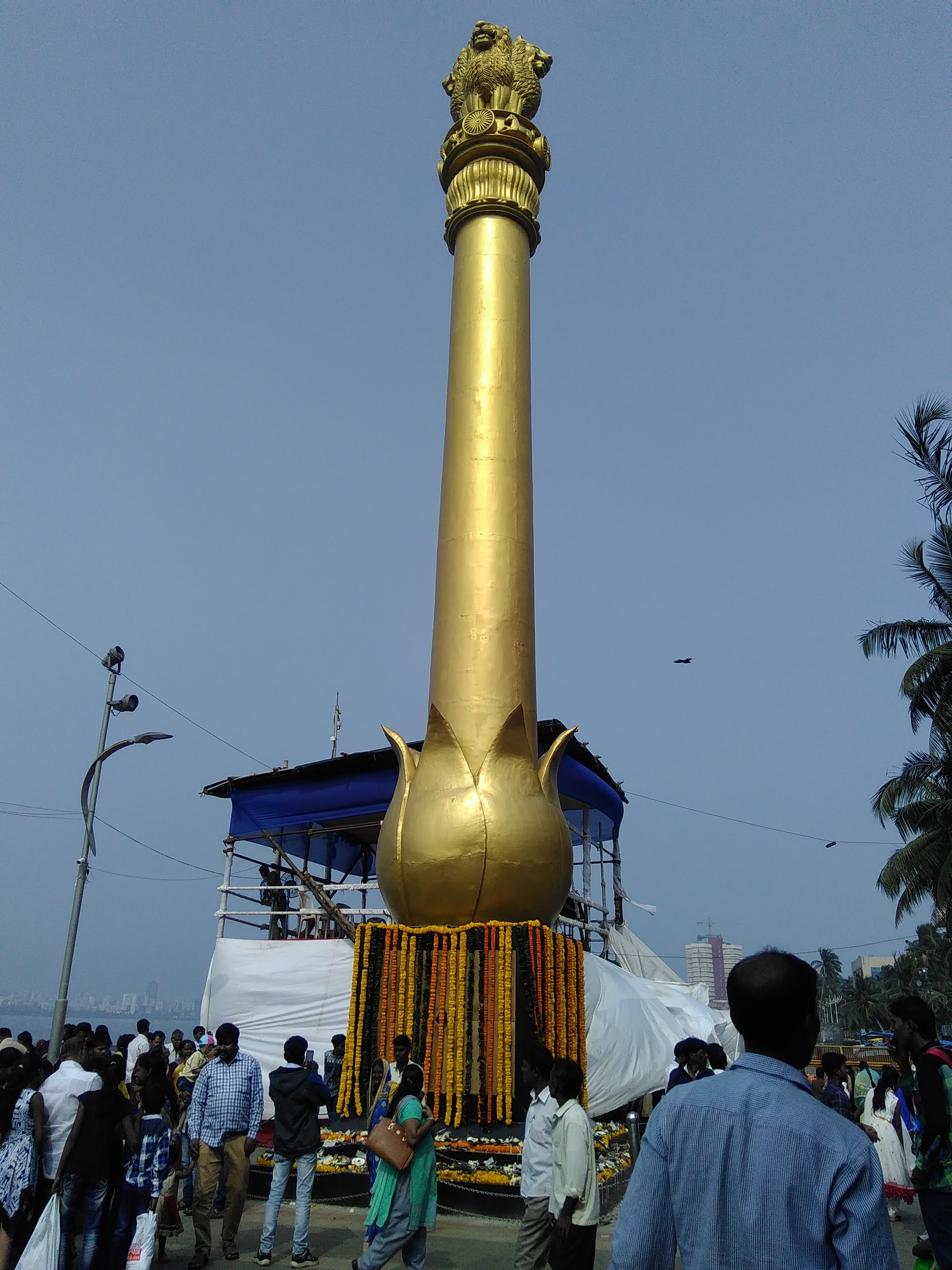
Ashoka pillar, Chaitya Bhoomi

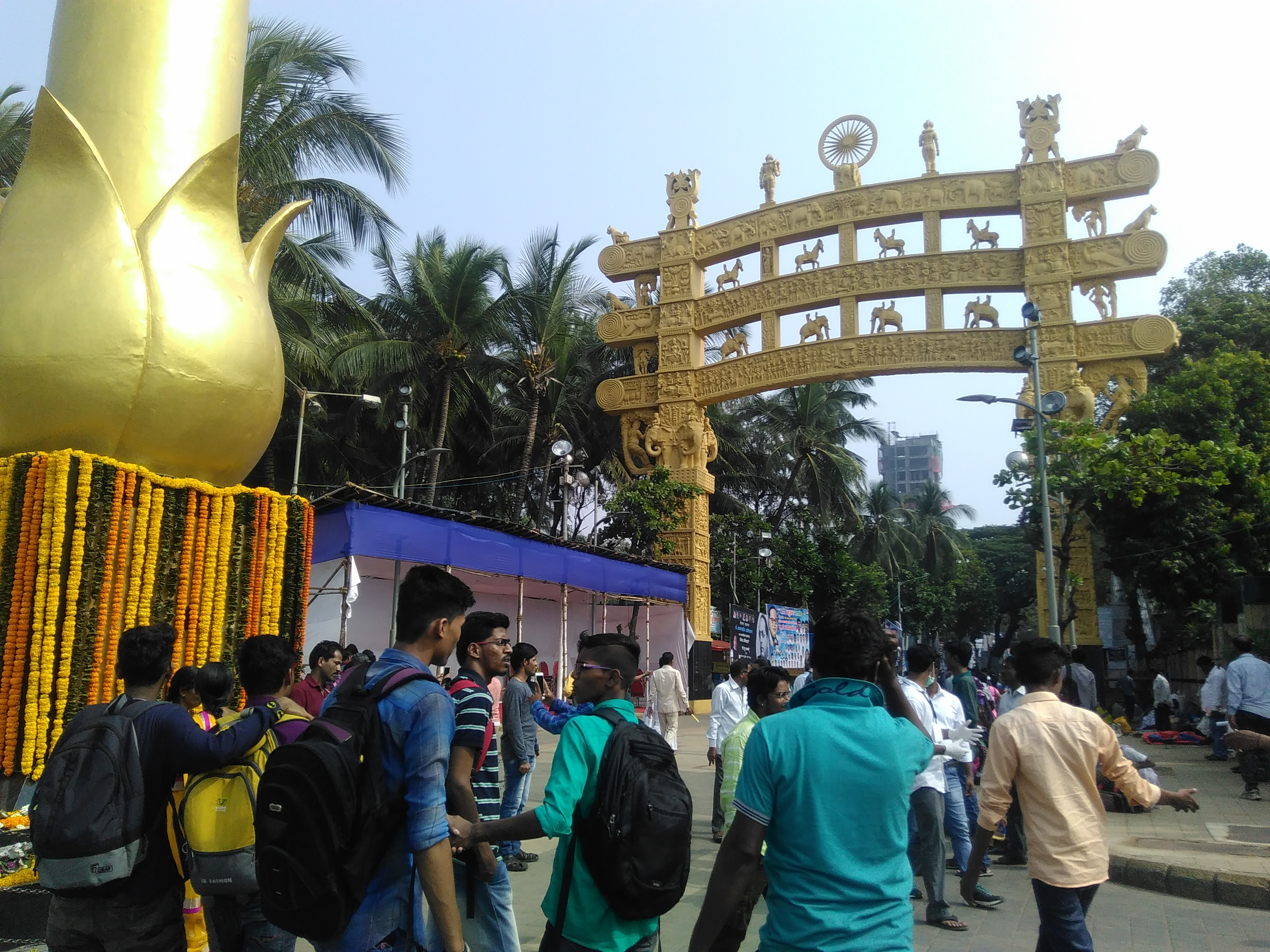
Ashoka pillar and Chaitya Bhoomi gate (inner side)

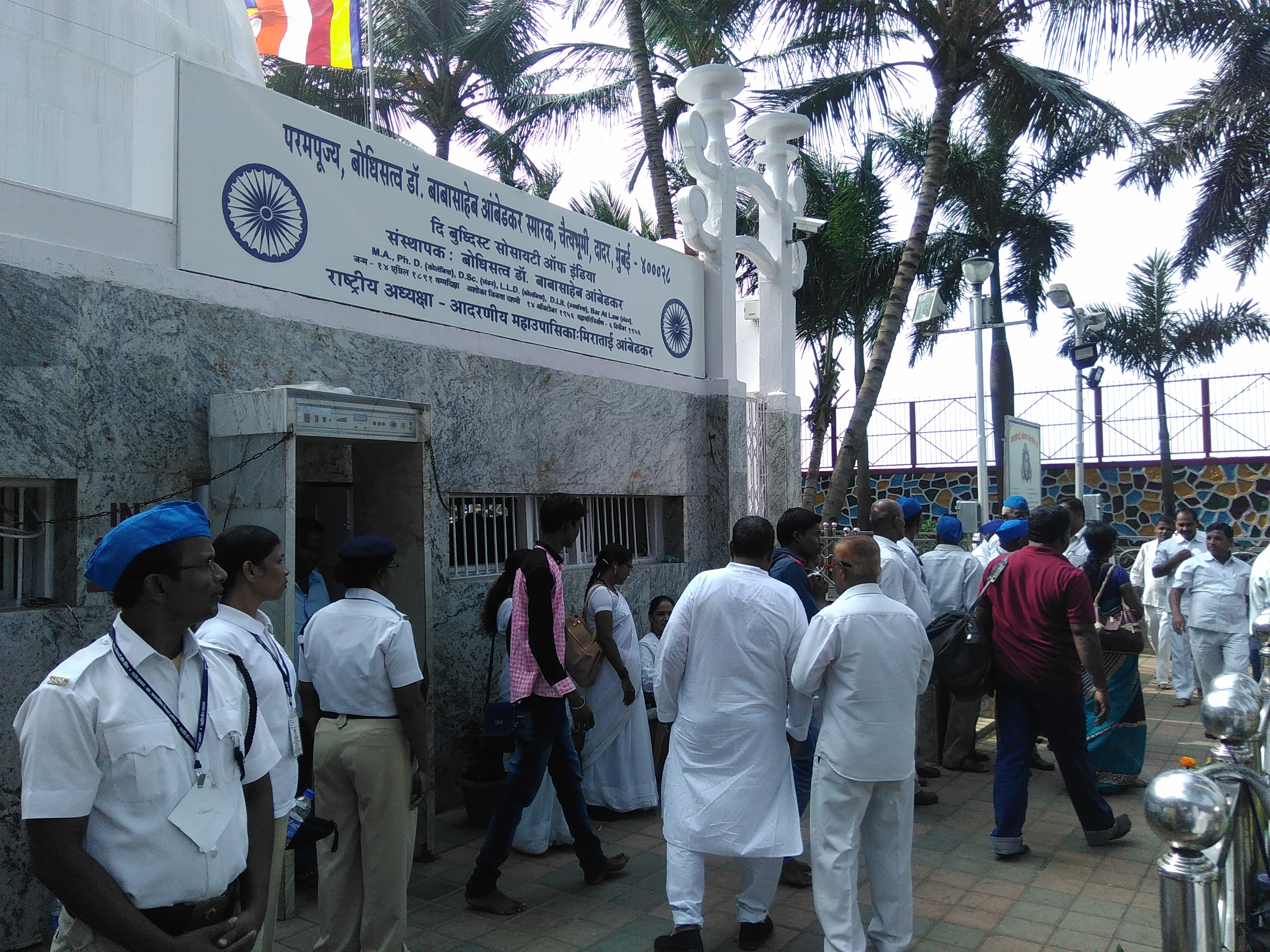
Chaitya Bhoomi Volunteers of Samata Sainik Dal and Ambedkars followers, surrounded by Chaitya Bhoomi on Mahaparinirvana Day

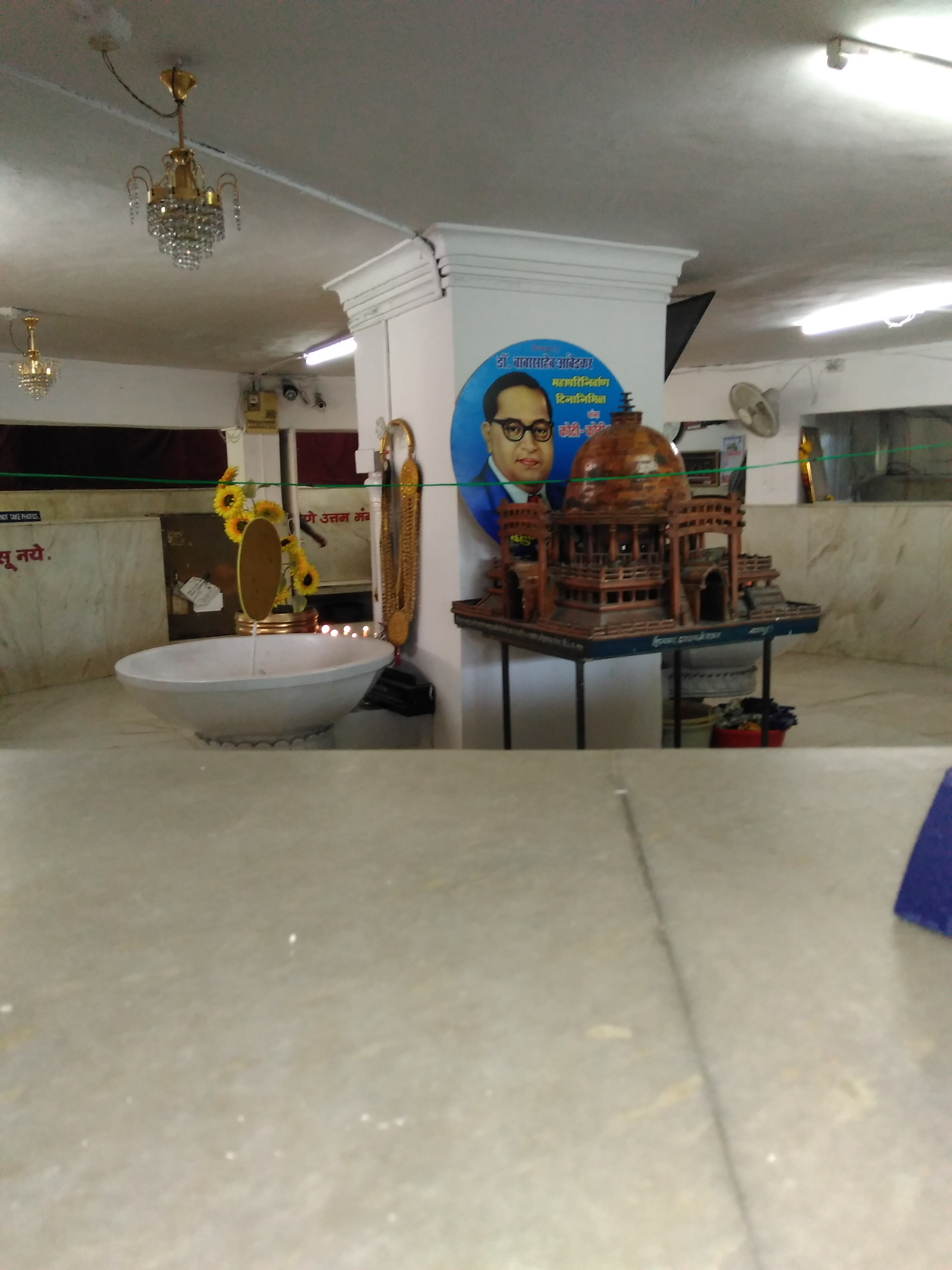
Structure of Chaitya Bhoomi stupa inside Chaitya Bhoomi

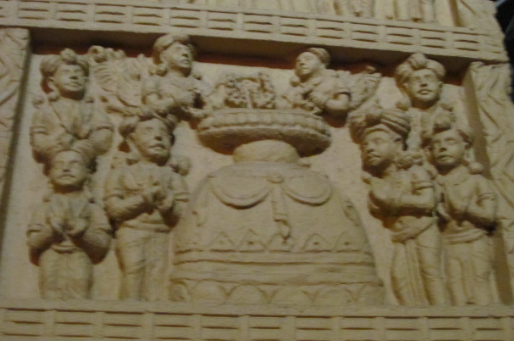
Replica of Sanchi gate carving at Chaitya Bhoomi

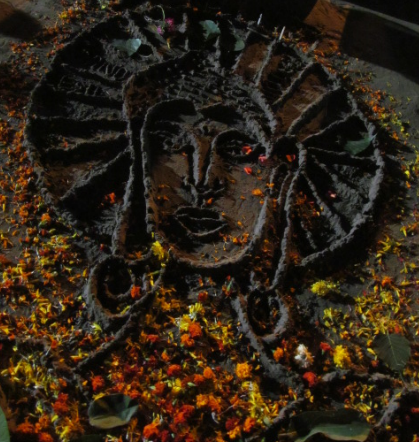
Sand carved Buddha at Dadar Chowpatty on Mahaparinirvan Din

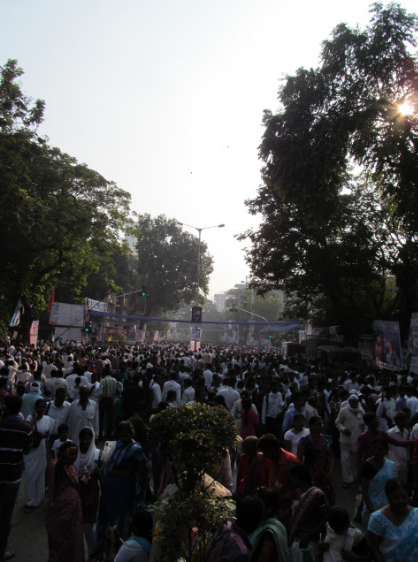
People across India gathered at Chaitya Bhoomi on 6 December

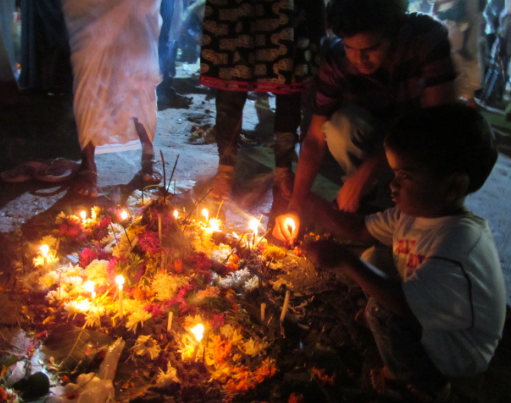
An offering at Dadar Chowpatty by family

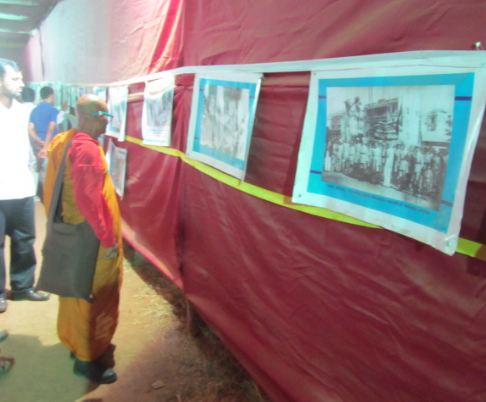
A Buddhist monk watching photo exhibition at Chaitya Bhoomi

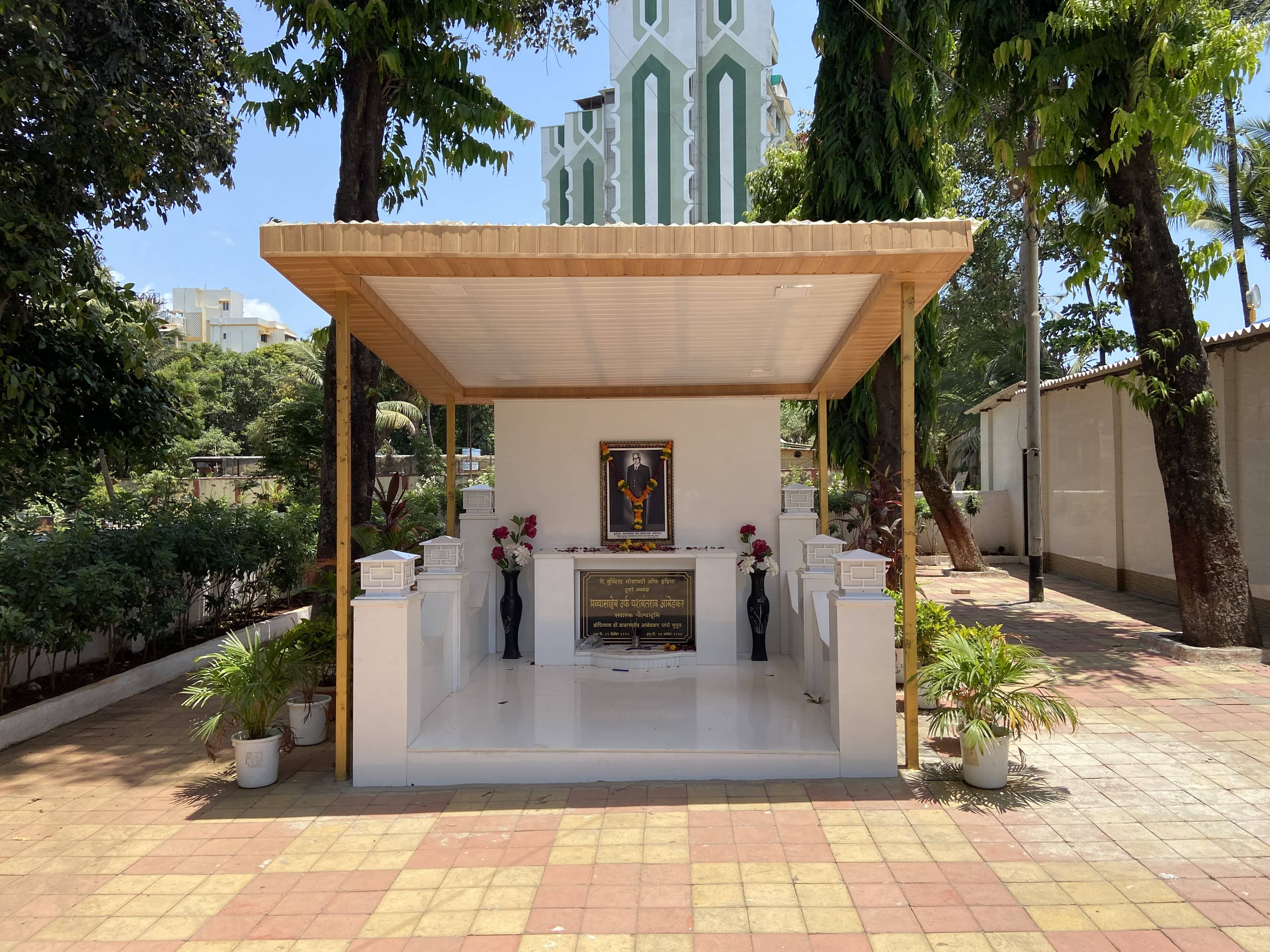
Resting Place Of Yashwant Bhimrao Ambedkar

== See also ==
- The Buddha and His Dhamma
- Dalit Buddhist Movement
- Deekshabhoomi
- Global Vipassana Pagoda
- Navayana Buddhism
- Statue of Equality
