= Ramabai (film) =

2016 film by M. Ranganath

- Movie poster
- Directed by: M. Ranganath
- Screenplay by: M. Ranganath
- Story by: Dr. Sidram Karanik
- Produced by: Y. Srinivas
- Starring: Yagna Shetty
- Cinematography: Gurudutt Musuri
- Edited by: Sanjeev Reddy
- Music by: K. Kalyan
- Production company: Sri Parameshwari Arts
- Release date: 14 April 2016
- Running time: 117 minutes
- Country: India
- Language: Kannada

Ramabai is a 2016 Indian biographical film in Kannada language, based on the life of Ramabai Ambedkar, the first wife of Indian social reformer and politician B. R. Ambedkar. The film is directed by M. Ranganath, and stars Yagna Shetty as the eponymous lead, and Siddaram Karnik as Ambedkar. The film was released on 14 April 2016 coinciding with the birthday of Dr. Ambedkar.

== Cast ==
- Yagna Shetty as Ramabai
- Dr. Sidram Karanik as B. R. Ambedkar
- Auditor Srinivas
- Nagaraj
- Bank Janardhan
- Sumathishree
- Mysore Ramanand

== Production ==
"I picked up reading materials and even researched her on the Internet in order to learn more about her and that period. I tried a few things while acting but the main inputs came from the director and the team... Through the process, he [Siddaram Karnik] researched Ramabai as well. That's how the script was written. We shot at the exact locations where Ramabai stayed. Major portions were shot in Dharwad and Karwar"

— Yagna Shetty, regarding her preparation for the role and filming.

Film producer Auditor Srinivas announced of making the film in February 2015. It was revealed that Vasudev Alur, predominantly a dialogue-writer in Kannada cinema, taking his original name M. Ranganath with the film, would direct it. In the same month, an audition was conducted by the makers to cast for supporting roles, in Bangalore. Yagna Shetty was cast to portray the role of Ramabai. Siddaram Karnik, an academic, who was researching on the life and work of B. R. Ambedkar at the time in Dharwad, was incidentally cast to play him in the film. Filming began on 27 March in Dharwad, following which it continued in Karwar, the two places where Ramabai and B. R. Ambedkar spent significant parts of their lives in, with the former having spent her final days in Dharwad. After a total of 30 days of filming, it completed by June 2015.

== See also ==
- Ramabai Bhimrao Ambedkar – a 2011 Marathi language film on the same subject
