= Dr. Babasaheb Ambedkar (film) =

2000 film by Jabbar Patel

- Directed by: Jabbar Patel
- Written by: Daya Pawar; Arun Sadhu; Sooni Taraporevala
- Produced by: Tirlok Malik
- Starring: Mammootty; Sonali Kulkarni; Mohan Gokhale; Mrinal Kulkarni
- Cinematography: Ashok Mehta
- Edited by: Vijay Khochikar
- Music by: Amar Haldipur
- Distributed by: The Mooknayak
- Release date: 15 December 2000
- Running time: 180 minutes
- Country: India
- Language: English
- Budget: ₹89.5 million

Dr. Babasaheb Ambedkar is a 2000 Indian English-language biographical film directed by Jabbar Patel. It stars Mammootty in the title role. The film tells the story of B. R. Ambedkar, known mainly for his contributions in the emancipation of the downtrodden and oppressed classes in India and shaping the Constitution of India, as the chairman of the Drafting Committee of the Indian Constituent Assembly.

When Jabbar Patel set out to make a biopic on Dr. B.R. Ambedkar, his first choice for the role was Shah Rukh Khan. SRK declined—not from disinterest, but out of respect. Patel then happened upon a photograph of Malayalam superstar Mammootty. Intrigued, he had Mammootty’s face photo-shopped to resemble Ambedkar and sought an introduction through filmmaker Adoor Gopalakrishnan. Soon after, Patel flew to Kochi to meet the actor.

At first, Mammootty refused outright, explaining that he avoided Hindi films and felt he bore no resemblance to Ambedkar. Patel then revealed the edited image. Seeing himself transformed, Mammootty realized he could embody the role. Yet one final obstacle remained: Patel insisted Ambedkar could not be portrayed with a moustache. Mammootty balked—his moustache was iconic, and he feared his fans would be shocked. Patel, however, stood firm.

Eventually, Mammootty agreed, and preparations for the role began. Looking back, his portrayal of Ambedkar is often regarded as deeply immersive—comparable in impact to Ben Kingsley’s performance as Gandhi.

Dr. Babasaheb Ambedkar won the National Film Awards for Best feature film in English, Best Actor (Mammootty) and Best Art Direction (Nitin Chandrakant Desai) in 1999. The film was screened retrospective on 15 August 2016 at the Independence Day Film Festival jointly presented by the Indian Directorate of Film Festivals and Ministry of Defence, commemorating 70th Indian Independence Day.

== Plot ==
Bhimrao Ambedkar, studying in the Columbia University library, is approached by Lala Lajpat Rai to join his home rule league but Ambedkar refuses to do so, as he came here on the scholarship of his highness, Sayajirao Gaekwad III of Baroda State. Ambedkar is unable to afford studying in America so he does part-time jobs of washing utensils.

He passed his M.A. exam in June 1915, majoring in economics, and other subjects of sociology, history, philosophy and anthropology. He presented a thesis in Ancient Indian Commerce. Ambedkar was influenced by John Dewey and his work on democracy. In 1916, he completed his second thesis, National Dividend of India – A Historic and Analytical Study for another M.A. In October 1916, he enrolled for the Bar course at Gray's Inn, and at the same time, enrolled at the London School of Economics where he started working on a doctoral thesis. In 1917, when the term of his scholarship from Baroda ended, he was compelled to go back to India in June with his work unfinished; he was however, given the permission to return and finish his work within four years. He sent his precious and much-loved collection of books back on a steamer, but it was torpedoed and sunk by a German submarine. Ambedkar went to the Baroda state to work as a probationer in the Accountant General's Office. A scholarship of 11.50 British pounds a month, for three years, was awarded to the young Ambedkar and per the agreement, he has to serve Baroda for 10 years after the completion of his studies. However, upon arriving in Baroda, he realized that none of the Hindu hotels would allow his to stay due to him being a low caste. He then found a Parsi inn where non-Parsis were not allowed to stay. He and the Parsi inn-keeper reached an agreement, where he was only allowed to stay if he gave a Parsi name. After joining the new office as a new senior officer (Probationary officer) as an untouchable, the peon of the office throws the file on the table instead of giving it to him. Later, Ambedkar feels thirsty and ask for a glass of water, to which the peon says that there is no water. When he goes on to drink water from the pot, the upper caste find this very uncomfortable and insult him and tell him that he isn't allowed to drink water from that pot as they drink from it. By his touch, it will pollute the water so they tell him to bring his own water and call him dirty and untouchable. After a few days of his stay in Baroda, it is discovered by other Parsis that he is not a Parsi and on the eleventh day of his stay, a group of angry Parsi men, armed with sticks, come to remove him from the inn. He had to leave the inn that very day, and not having a place to stay, he was forced to leave Baroda and return to Bombay to find work elsewhere.

In Bombay, Ambedkar applies for the post of professorship as a professor of political economy in Sydenham College of Commerce and Economics. On the first day of his job, the students make fun of him for being an untouchable and probably not knowing English. When Ambedkar comes to drink from the water pot in the staff room, a professor named Trivedi doesn't like it and instead insults him. After meeting Shri Shahu Maharaj of Kolhapur, Ambedkar starts a newspaper called Mooknayak in the year 1920. Ambedkar took a conference in Mangaon in Kolhapur, attended by Shri Shahu Maharaj. The Maharaj declared in prophetic vein, "You have found your saviour in Ambedkar and I am confident that he will break your shackles".

== Cast ==
- Mammootty as Dr. B. R. Ambedkar
- Sonali Kulkarni as Ramabai Ambedkar, first wife of Ambedkar
  - Priya Bapat as young Ramabai
- Mrinal Kulkarni as Savita Ambedkar, second wife of Babasaheb
- Govind Namdeo as Subedar Ramji Maloji Sakpal, father of Babasaheb
- Mohan Gokhale as Mahatma Gandhi
- Tirlok Malik as Lala Lajpat Rai
- Anjan Srivastav as Sayajirao Gaekwad III
- Nawazuddin Siddiqui as one of the leaders of Second Mahad Satyagraha and in background of Manusmriti Dahan
- Sushant Singh as Asnodkar, a friend he met while studying in London
- Nandu Madhav as Gangadhar Nilkanth Sahasrabuddhe
- Ashok Lokhande as Bhaurao Gaikwad
- Nikhil Ratnaparkhi as Professor Trivedi ( Special Appearance)

== Production ==
The film was a project funded jointly by the Ministry of Social Justice and Empowerment and the Government of Maharashtra. It was made at a budget of ₹ 89.5 million. The production was managed by the government-owned National Film Development Corporation of India.

In an interview with Pritish Nandy of Rediff.com, director Jabbar Patel said that the research and filming took three years each. The government said they wanted a film on the scale of Richard Attenborough's Gandhi. For the role of Ambedkar, they considered hundreds of actors around the world. Patel claimed that, in that search, they also sought Robert De Niro who was very keen on the role but backed off when he was told that he had to drop his American accent and speak the way Ambedkar did—in his typically "clipped Indo-British accent". Mammootty was cast by chance when Patel saw his picture on a magazine and felt he had some resemblance with Ambedkar. Mammootty was initially resistant to be cast as that would have meant shaving off his mustache, recalls Patel. Since there were no footage of Ambedkar available to them, his body language and way of talking was to be done out of imagination. The film was simultaneously shot in English and Hindi.

Although Dr. Babasaheb Ambedkar was certified in 1998, it was released commercially in 2000.

== Music ==
Track list
No.	Title	Lyrics	Singer(s)	Length
1.	"Kabir Kahe" (Hindi language song)	Kabir	Ravindra Sathe, Vinod Sehgal	5:31
2.	"Buddham Saranang Gachhami" (Pali language song)	Bhikkhus	Jayashree Shivram and Roop Kumar Rathod	4:49
3.	"Bhamaichya Wasracha" (Marathi language song)	Vitthal Umap	Vitthal Umap

== Awards ==
The film won National Film Awards (India) in 1999.

- Best Actor – Mammootty
- Best Art Direction – Nitin Chandrakant Desai

== See also ==
- List of artistic depictions of Mahatma Gandhi
