= Ramabai Ambedkar =

B. R. Ambedkar's first wife

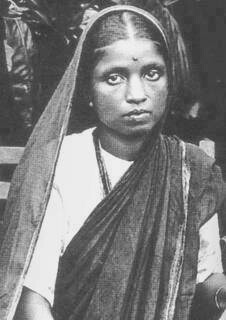
- Ramabai Ambedkar
- Born: 1896 or 1897; Vanand, Bombay Presidency, British India (now in Maharashtra, India)
- Died: May 27, 1935; Rajgruha, Bombay, British India
- Other names: Ramai (Mother Rama), Ramu
- Spouse: B. R. Ambedkar
- Children: 5, including Yashwant

Ramabai Bhimrao Ambedkar (1896/1897 – 27 May 1935) was the wife of B. R. Ambedkar, who said her support was instrumental in helping him pursue his higher education and his true potential. She has been the subject of many biographical movies and books. Several landmarks across India have been named after her. She is also known as Ramai (Mother Rama).

== Early life ==
Ramabai was born in a poor family to Bhiku Dhotre (Valangkar) and Rukmini. She lived with her three sisters and a brother, Shankar Bikaji Dhotre, in the Mahapura locality in the village of Vanand, near Dapoli, Ratnagiri. Her father earned his livelihood by carrying baskets of fish from Harnai Bunder & Dabhol harbour to the market. Her mother died when she was young and, after her father also died, her uncles, Valangkar and Govindpurkar, took the children to Bombay to live with them in Byculla market.

== Marriage ==
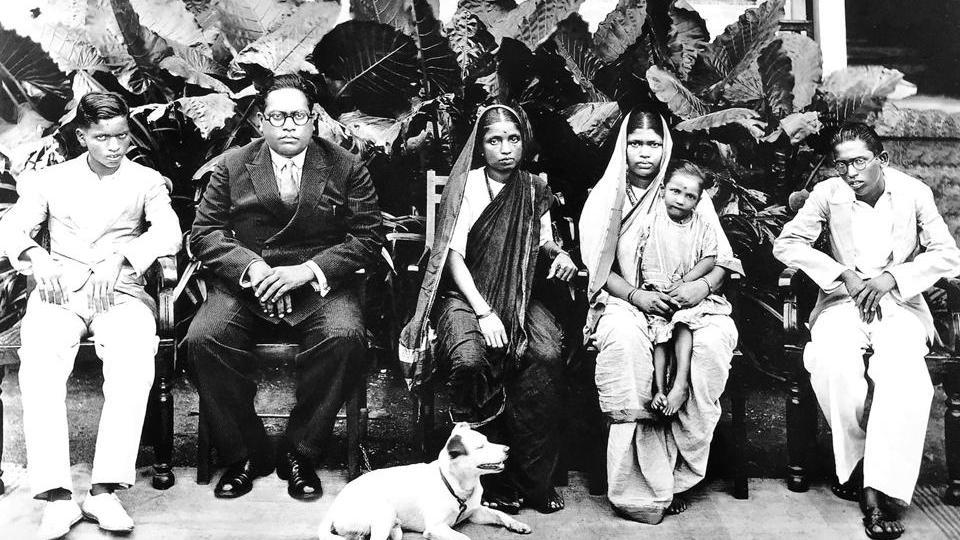
Ambedkar with his family members at Rajgruha, his residence in Mumbai in February 1934. From left – Yashwant (Son), Dr. B. R. Ambedkar, Smt. Ramabai, Smt. Laxmibai (wife of BR Ambedkar's elder brother, Anand) and nephew (Mukundrao Anandrao Ambedkar) and Dr. Ambedkar's favorite dog, Tobby.

Ramabai married Bhimrao in 4 April 1906 in a very simple ceremony in the vegetable market of Byculla, Mumbai. Like her spouse, the exact birth year of Ramabai is not documented. Older records tell varied birth date and year. Dhananjay Keer states that she was married to Bhimrao when she was nine years old. At the time, Ambedkar was aged 15 and Ramabai was 9. His affectionate name for her was "Rāmu", while she called him "Saheb". They had five children – Yashwant, Gangadhar, Ramesh, Indu (daughter) and Rajratna. Apart from Yashwant (1912–1977), the other four died in their childhood.

== Death ==
Ramabai died on 27 May 1935 at Rajgruha in Hindu Colony, Dadar, Bombay, after a prolonged chronic illness. She had been married to Ambedkar for 29 years.

== Credit by her husband ==
B. R. Ambedkar's book Thoughts on Pakistan, published in 1941, was dedicated to Ramabai. In the preface, Ambedkar credits her with his transformation from an ordinary Bhiva or Bhima to Dr Ambedkar.

== Influence and in popular legacy ==
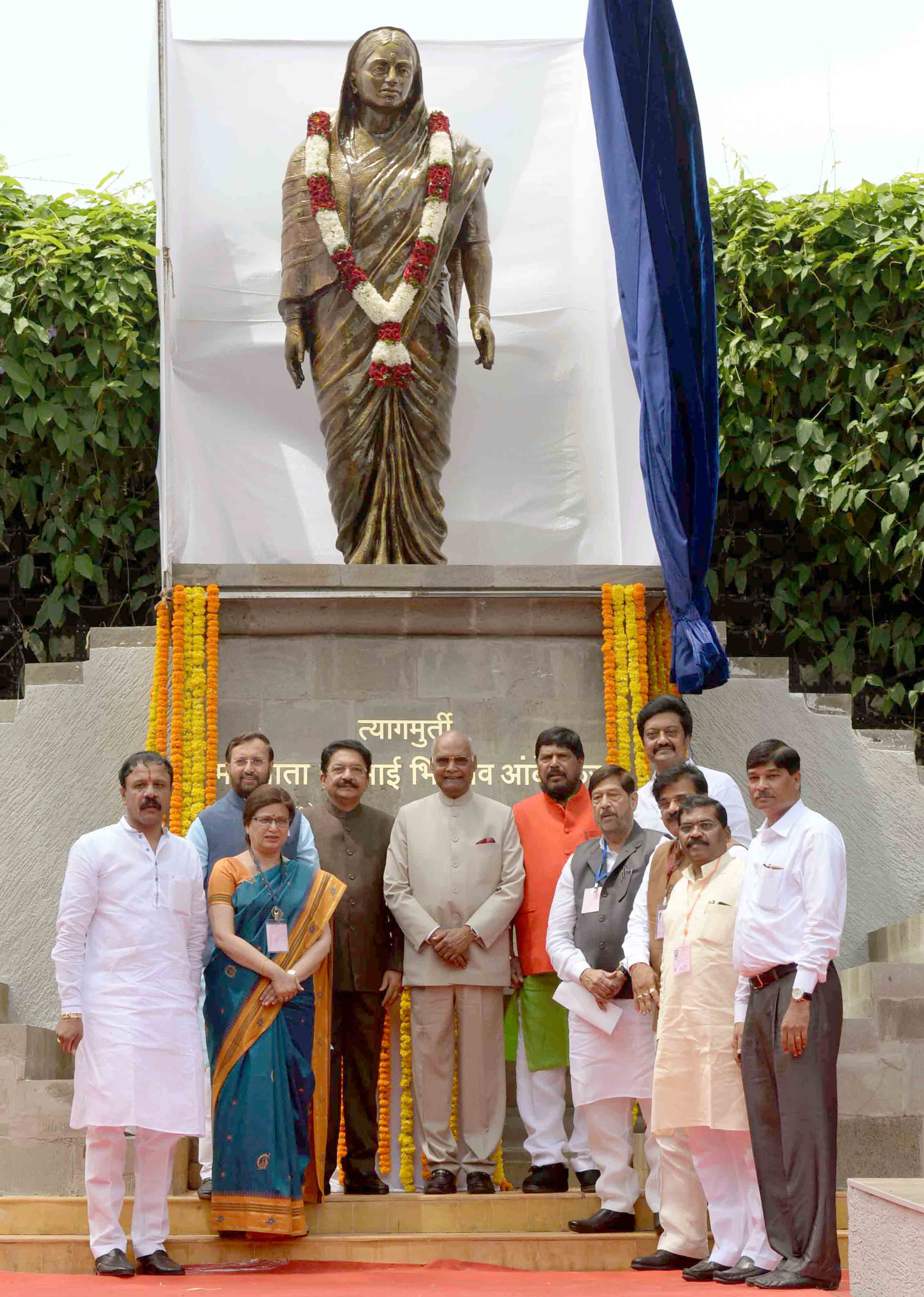
The President of India, Ram Nath Kovind, unveiling the statue of Ramabai Ambedkar, at Pune, in Maharashtra on 30 May 2018

Ramabai's life has been featured in the following:

=== Movies, televisions and drama ===
- Ramai, a 1992 drama directed by Ashok Gawali
- Bhim Garjana, a 1990 Marathi film directed by Vijay Pawar, the role of Ramabai Ambedkar was played by Prathama Devi.
- Yugpurush Dr. Babasaheb Ambedkar, a 1993 Marathi film directed by Shashikant Nalavade, the role of Ramabai Ambedkar was played by Chitra Koppikar.
- Dr. Babasaheb Ambedkar, a 2000 English film directed by Jabbar Patel, the role of Ramabai Ambedkar was played by Sonali Kulkarni.
- Dr. B. R. Ambedkar, a 2005 Kannada film directed by Sharan Kumar Kabbur, the role of Ramabai Ambedkar was played by Tara Anuradha.
- Ramabai Bhimrao Ambedkar, a 2011 Marathi film directed by Prakash Jadhav, the role of Ramabai Ambedkar was played by Nisha Parulekar.
- Ramabai, a 2016 Kannada film directed by M. Ranganath, the role of Ramabai Ambedkar was played by Yagna Shetty.
- Dr. Ambedkar, a Hindi television series aired on DD National.
- Garja Maharashtra (2018–19), a Marathi television series aired on Sony Marathi.
- Dr. Babasaheb Ambedkar – Mahamanvachi Gauravgatha (2019), a Marathi television series airing on Star Pravah starring Shivani Rangole as Ramabai Ambedkar while Mrunmayi Supal portrayed the young version of the character.

=== Books ===
- Ramai, by Yashwant Manohar
- Tyagawanti Rama Mauli, by Nana Dhakulkar, Vijay Publications (Nagpur)
- Priya Ramu, by Yogiraj Bagul, Granthali Publication

== See also ==
- 1997 Ramabai killings
- Ambedkar family
- Savita Ambedkar
