= Statue of B. R. Ambedkar, Hyderabad =

Colossal statue of B. R. Ambedkar in Telangana, India

Dr. B. R. Ambedkar Statue
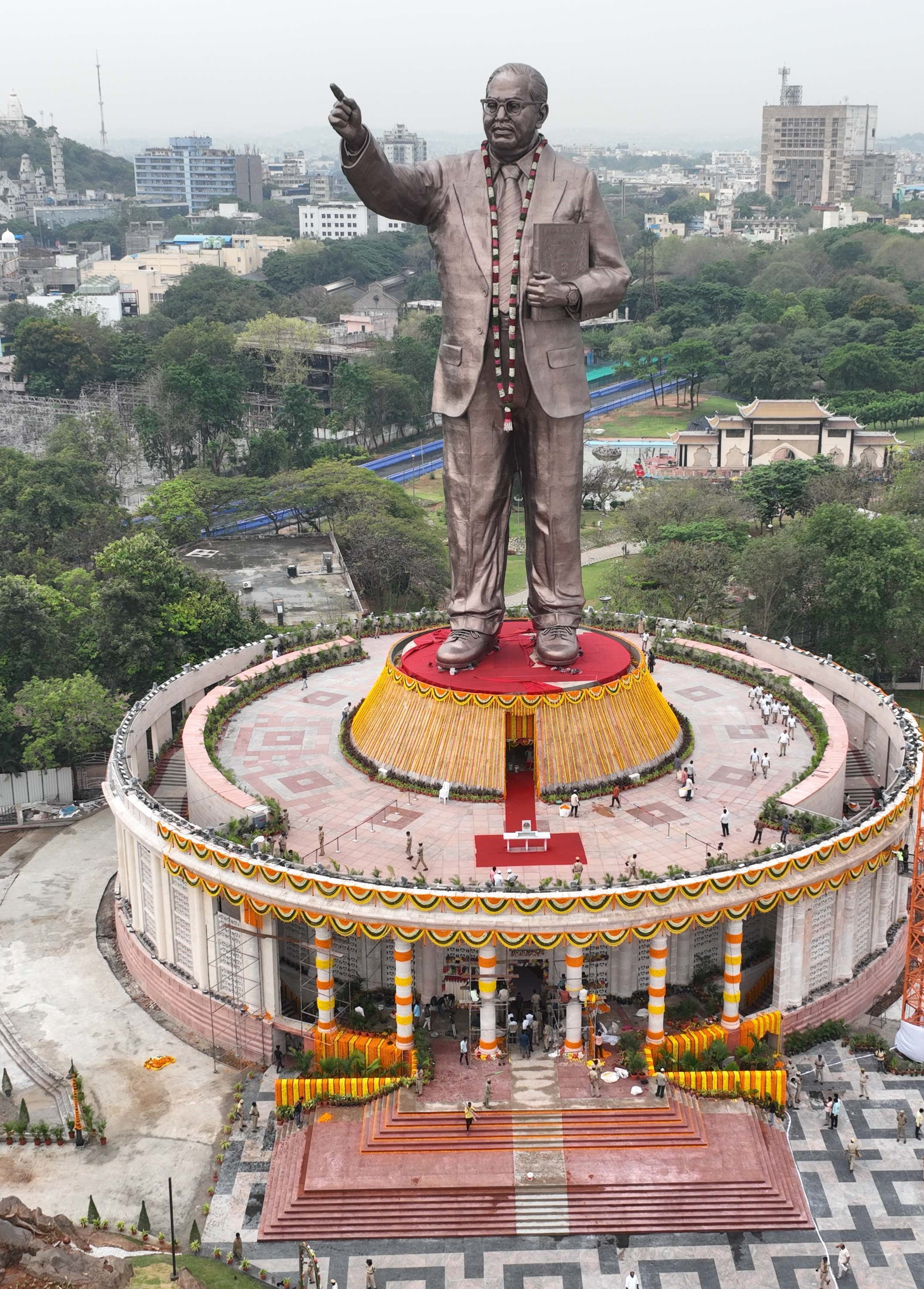
- 125 feet Ambedkar Statue in Hyderabad, Telangana
- Interactive map of Dr. B. R. Ambedkar Statue
- Location: Hyderabad, Telangana, India
- Designer: Ram V. Sutar
- Type: Statue
- Material: Steel, brass, bronze, and concrete
- Width: 45.5 feet (13.9 m)
- Height: Statue: 125 feet (38 m); Including Base: 175 feet (53 m)
- Beginning date: 14 April 2016
- Completion date: 13 April 2023
- Opening date: 14 April 2023
- Dedicated to: B. R. Ambedkar

The Dr. B. R. Ambedkar Statue is a 125 feet (38 m) statue located in Hyderabad, the capital city of Telangana, India.

== Details ==
The statue is 125 feet (38 m) tall and stands on a 50 feet (15 m) high plinth, thus its total height is 175 feet (53 m). After the Statue of Social Justice in Vijayawada, this is the tallest statue of B. R. Ambedkar in the world. It is the fifth tallest, and third tallest standing statue in India.

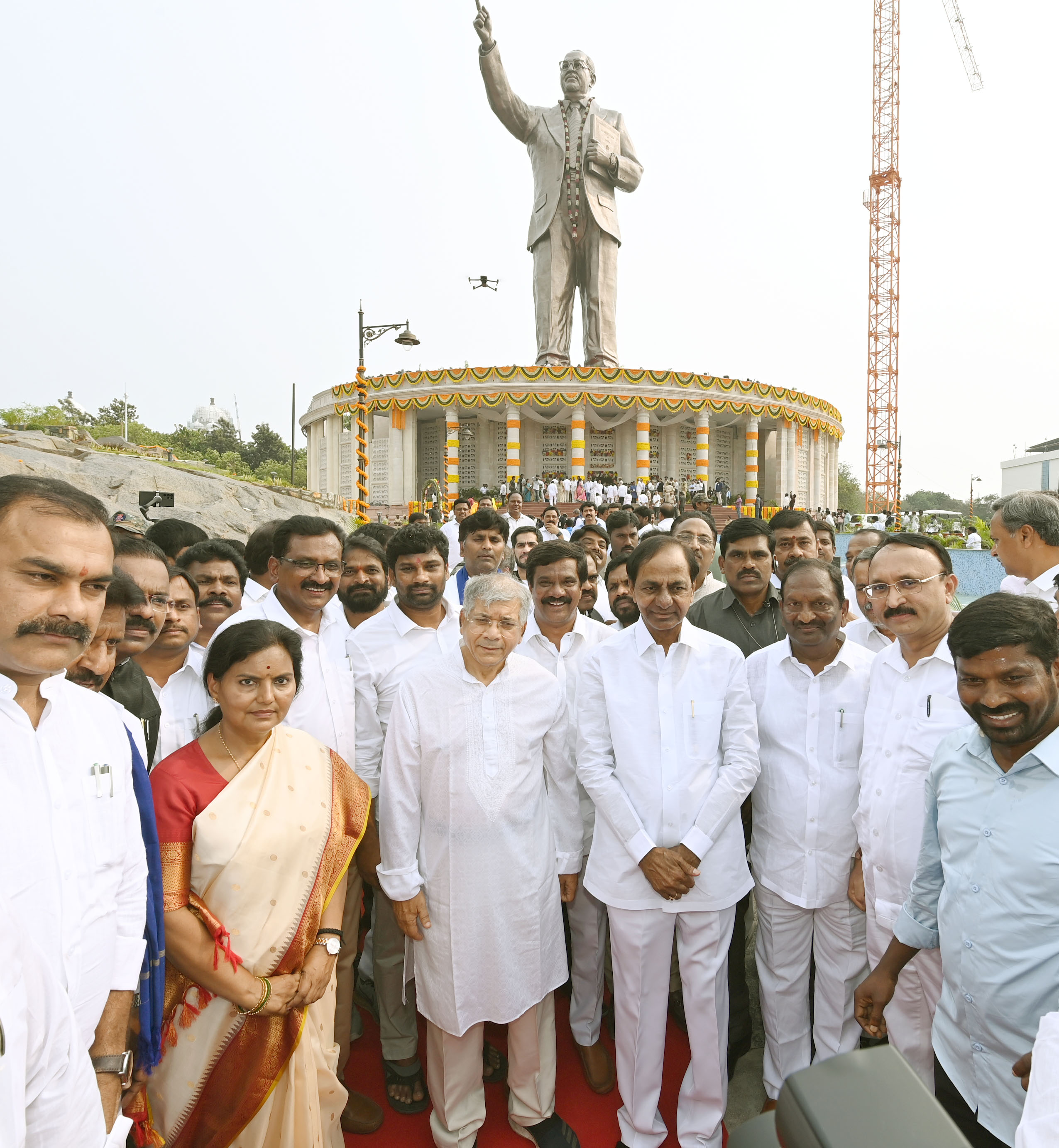
CM K. Chandrashekar Rao, Prakash Ambedkar in front of 125 feet Ambedkar Statue in Hyderabad on 14 April 2023

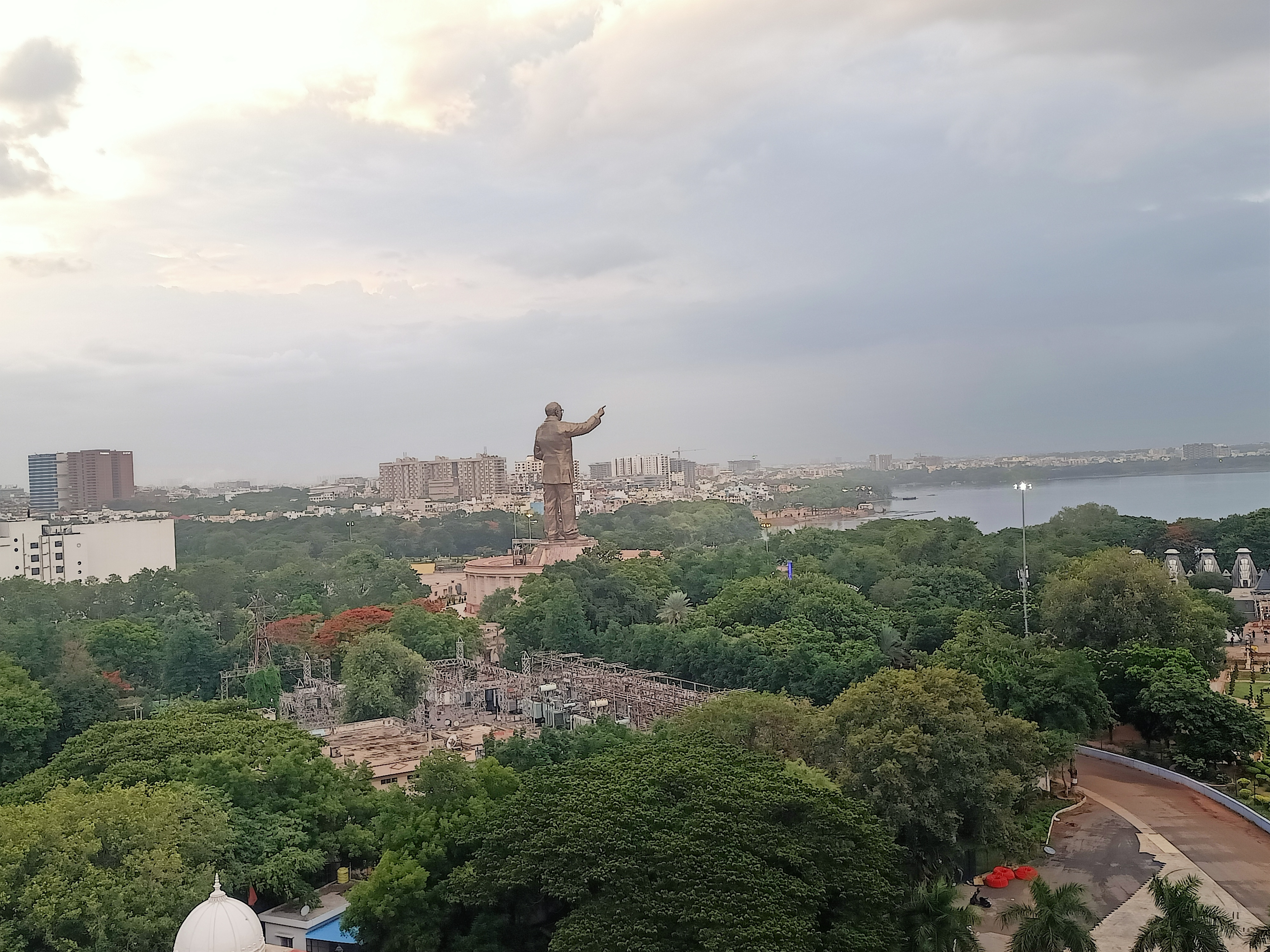
View from Dr. B. R. Ambedkar Telangana State Secretariat

The then Chief Minister of Telangana K. Chandrasekhar Rao laid the foundation stone of Ambedkar's 125 feet tall statue on 14 April 2016 on the occasion of his 125th birth anniversary. The foundation stone was laid in 2016, but the construction of the statue began in 2021. After 7 years, the CM unveiled this giant statue of Ambedkar on 14 April 2023 on the occasion of his 132nd birth anniversary. The statue was designed by Ram V. Sutar.

The memorial is spread over an area of 11.8 acres. It has a grand statue, foundation building, a replica of the Indian Parliament, museum, library, conference hall and other structures. The cost for the entire monument was around Rs. 146.5 crores.

The foundation stone (replica of Parliament House) on which the statue is installed is three storeyed and has a total built up area of 26,258 square feet. This memorial has a museum which has many articles and pictures depicting the life history of Dr. Babasaheb Ambedkar. There is also a library related to audio-visuals of Ambedkar's life.

The entire campus spread over 11.8 acres is decorated with 2.93 acres of landscape and greenery. There are two lifts for visitors to the top of the platform to reach the feet of Dr Babasaheb Ambedkar. In the statue, Babasaheb is depicted holding the Constitution in his hand. 791 tonnes of stainless steel and 9 tonnes of brass have been used for this statue.

There is the Dr. B. R. Ambedkar Telangana State Secretariat beside the statue.

== See also ==
- Statue of Social Justice, Vijayawada
- Statue of Equality, Mumbai
- Ambedkar Memorial Park
- Dr. Ambedkar National Memorial
- List of things named after B. R. Ambedkar
