= Statue of Social Justice =

Colossal statue of B. R. Ambedkar in Vijayawada, India

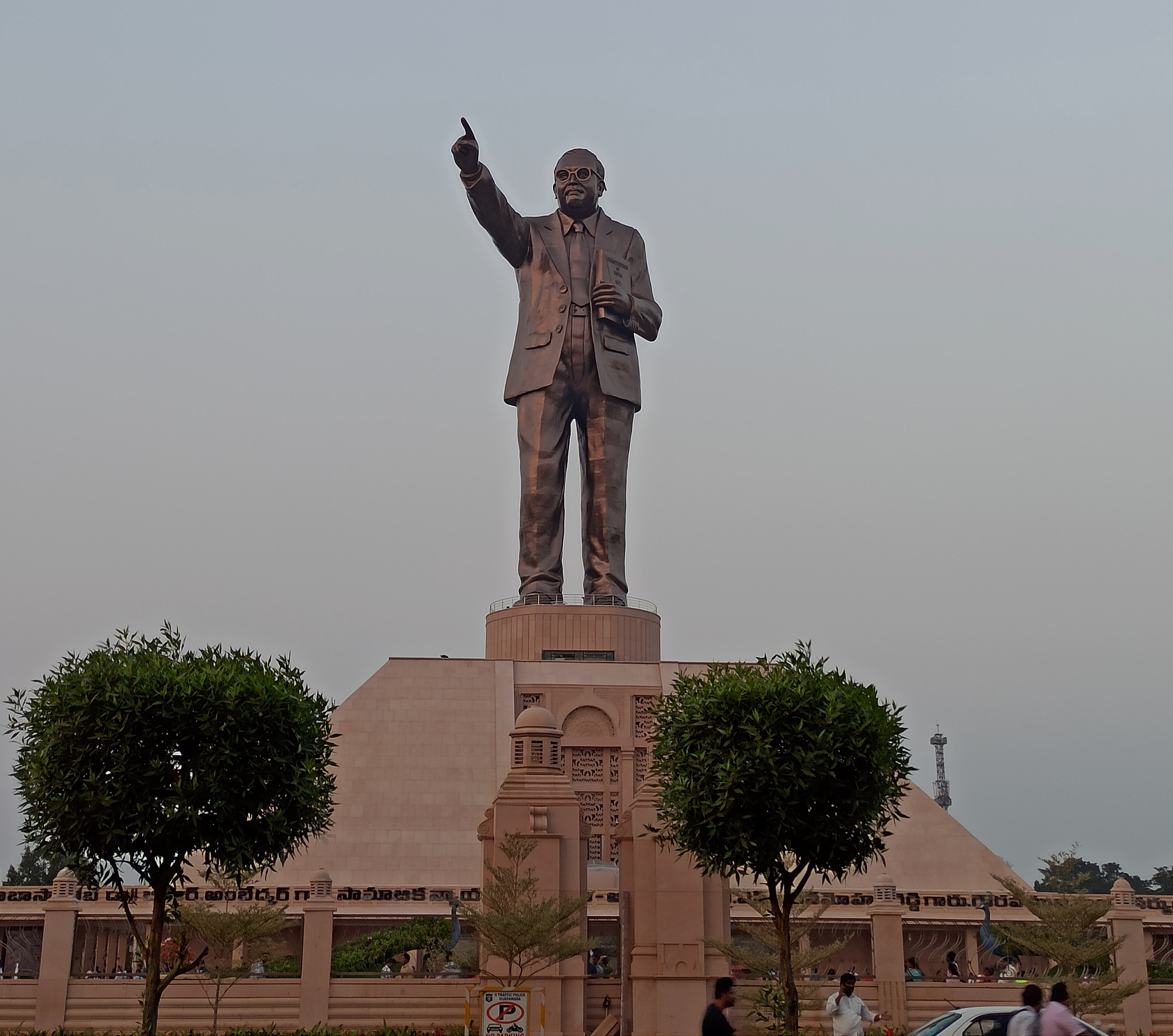
- The Statue of Social Justice of B. R. Ambedkar
- Interactive map of Statue of Social Justice
- Location: Swarajya Maidanam, Vijayawada, Andhra Pradesh, India
- Coordinates: 16°40′26″N 80°37′53″E
- Type: Statue
- Material: Steel, brass, bronze, and concrete
- Height: Statue: 206 feet (63 m); Including Base: 206 feet (63 m)
- Beginning date: 9 July 2020
- Completion date: 18 January 2024
- Opening date: 19 January 2024
- Dedicated to: B. R. Ambedkar

The Statue of Social Justice also known as the Dr. B. R. Ambedkar Smriti Vanam (English: Dr. B. R. Ambedkar Memorial), is a 206-ft tall statue located in Vijayawada in the Indian state of Andhra Pradesh. The memorial dedicated to B. R. Ambedkar, an Indian polymath, statesman, social reformer and the father of the Indian Constitution. The statue is 125 feet (38 m) tall and stands on an 81 feet (25 m) tall base building, making its total height 206 feet (63 m). It is the fourth tallest statue in India.

== History ==
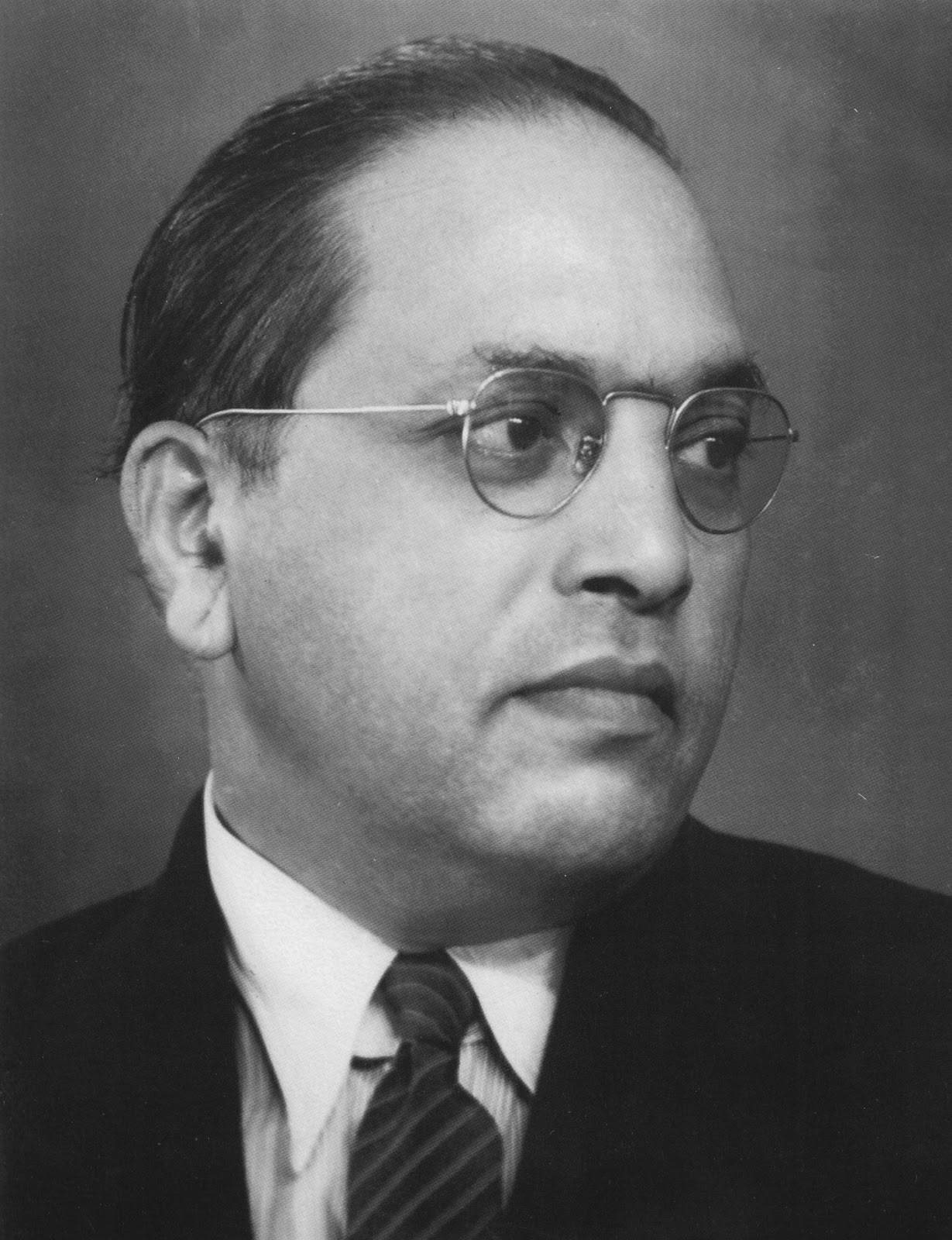
B. R. Ambedkar (1891–1956) was one of the most prominent Indian leaders, a social reformer and the father of the Indian Constitution.

Babasaheb Ambedkar was a crusader for social justice and was the chief architect of India's Constitution which secured social and fundamental legal rights and equality for its citizens. A barrister, economist, politician and reformer, he was the first Law and Justice Minister of independent India. He was commonly known as the ‘Champion of the Untouchables.’

The Government of Andhra Pradesh decided that on the occasion of 125th birth anniversary of Ambedkar i.e. 14 April 2016, an Ambedkar Memorial would be set up which would be 206 feet high. In April 2016, the Chief Minister of Telangana, K. Chandrasekhar Rao, has also decided to install a 206-feet tall statue of Ambedkar in Hyderabad city.

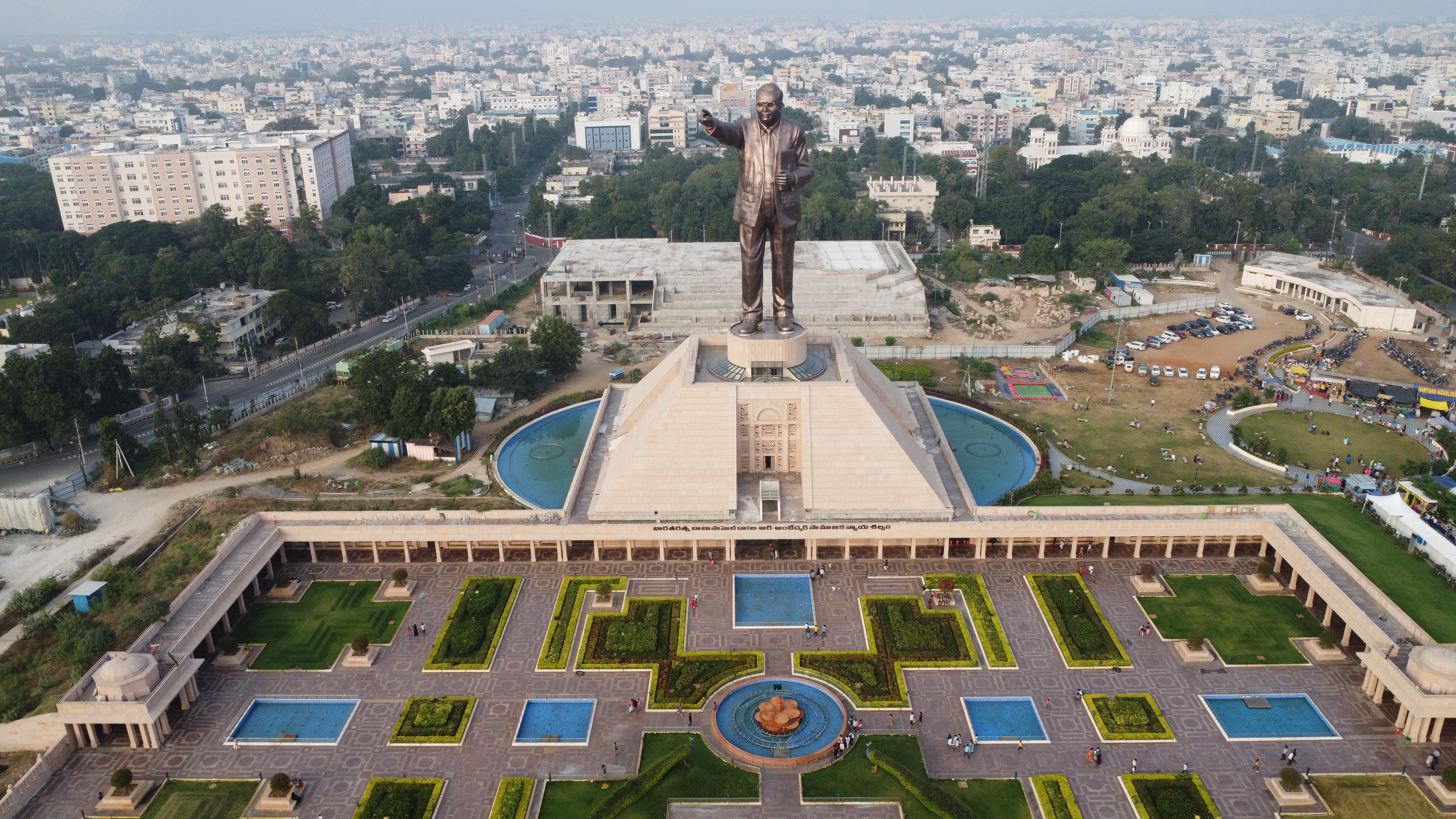
Statue of Social Justice front view

The foundation stone of the memorial was laid by N. Chandrababu Naidu, the Chief Minister of Andhra Pradesh on the 126th birth anniversary of Ambedkar in 2017. The project was to be implemented in Inavolu village of Amaravati, the new capital of Andhra Pradesh. In this project, there was a plan to build a grand memorial of Dr. Babasaheb Ambedkar and his 206 feet tall statue. Later in 2019, the ex-government of Y. S. Jagan Mohan Reddy abandoned the "Dr. B.R. Ambedkar Smriti Vanam" project, and decided to build a new project in Vijayawada city.

On July 9, 2020, Ex-Andhra Pradesh Chief Minister Y. S. Jagan Mohan Reddy laid the foundation stone of the 206 feet tall statue of Dr. Babasaheb Ambedkar at Swaraj Maidan in the heart of Vijayawada, Andhra Pradesh. The government of Andhra Pradesh has renamed the ground known as 'PWD Maidan' as 'Dr. B. R. Ambedkar Swarajya Maidan'. On 19 January 2024, the Statue of Social Justice was unveiled by Y. S. Jagan Mohan Reddy, the ex-Chief Minister of Andhra Pradesh.

== Specifications ==
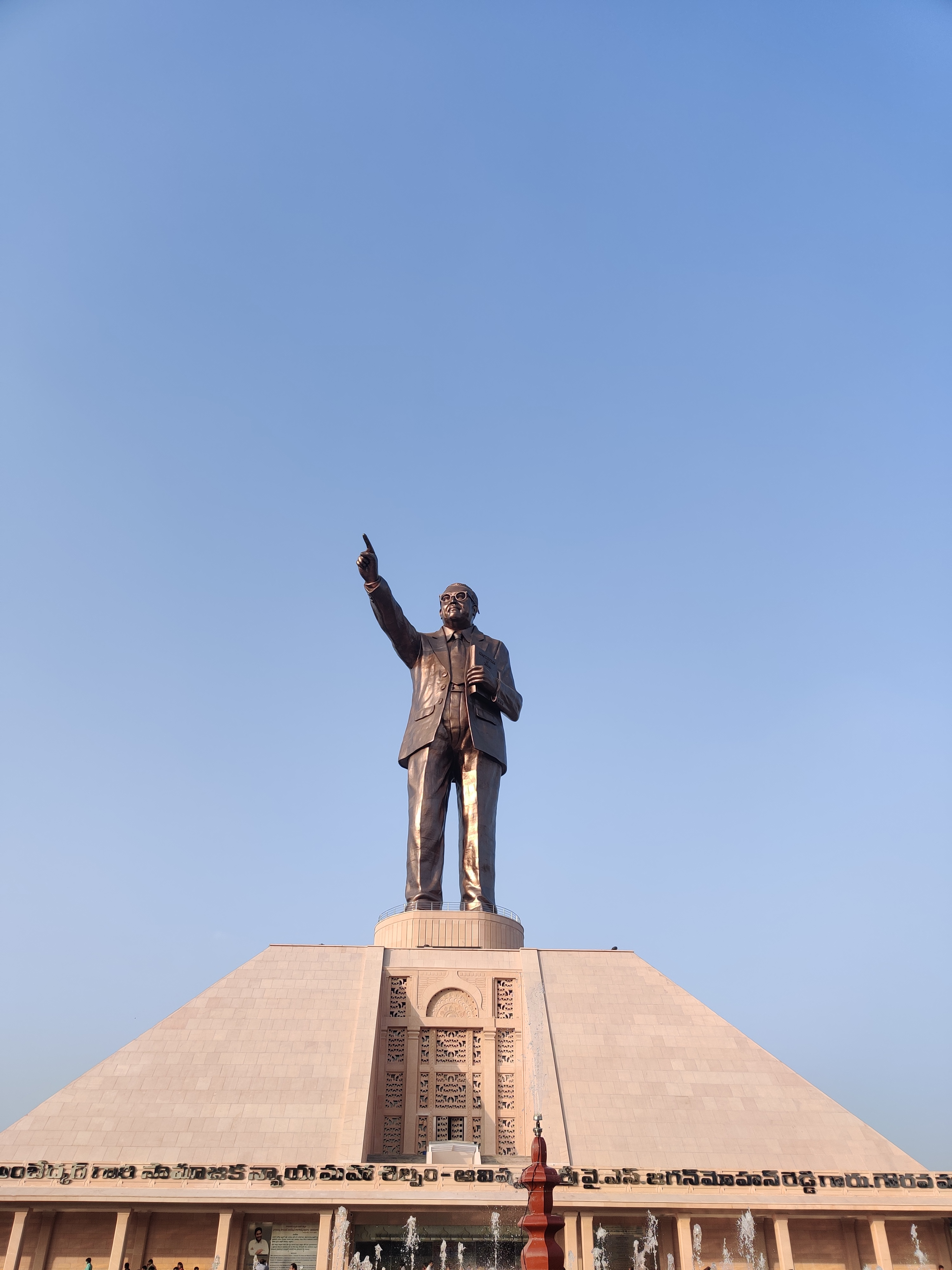
A view of Statue of Social Justice at afternoon

The Statue of Social Justice is the tallest Ambedkar's statue in the world. The Statue of Social Justice is 206 feet tall and is built on an 81-foot plinth, giving a total height of 206 feet. It is the fourth tallest, and the second tallest standing statue in India. The Statue of Social Justice is among the top 40 tallest statues in the world. The second-tallest Ambedkar statue, which is 175 feet, is situated in neighbouring Telangana, Hyderabad.

The statue has been built in 18.81 acres (7.61 ha) in the Dr. B. R. Ambedkar Smriti Vanam in Vijayawada at a cost of ₹404.35 crore.

The dazzling 206-foot bronze statue was installed on an 81-foot pedestal made with Kala Chakra Maha Mandala Buddhist architecture to make it attractive in its sky-high posture. The structure's foundation, reinforced by 539 piles, each extending 30 meters deep, provides a sturdy and resilient base. Incorporating design elements such as shear walls, inclined slabs, and beams with a 50-degree tilt not only enhances its structural integrity but also contributes to the distinctive aesthetic appeal of the building.

The statue of Ambedkar represents the importance of equality and liberty along with social justice. The Ambedkar Smriti Vanam has many facilities such as Ambedkar's biographical museum, a mini theatre, a convention centre, sky lighting, fountains, a library among others. The Ambedkar memorial also has a multipurpose convention hall with 3,000 seats, an open theatre with 2,000 seats, and a library with 10,000 books. From sourcing the raw material to designing, the construction of the statue was completely done under a 'Made in India' project. About 400 tons of steel is used to make it.

The Ambedkar Smruthi Vanam also consists of a detailed Ambedkar Experience section that depicts the life and times of the visionary. The pedestal consists of ground plus two floors, with the ground floor having four halls, with one of them being a cinema hall and the rest having digital museums detailing Ambedkar's life. While one of the four halls on the first floor is dedicated to displaying BR Ambedkar's attachment to South India, two of them would be dedicated to museums, and the fourth one would be used as library. The four halls on the second floor are being proposed to be used as libraries. The entire premises were spruced up with beautiful flower plants and attractive marble-made pathways by designers.

== Gallery ==
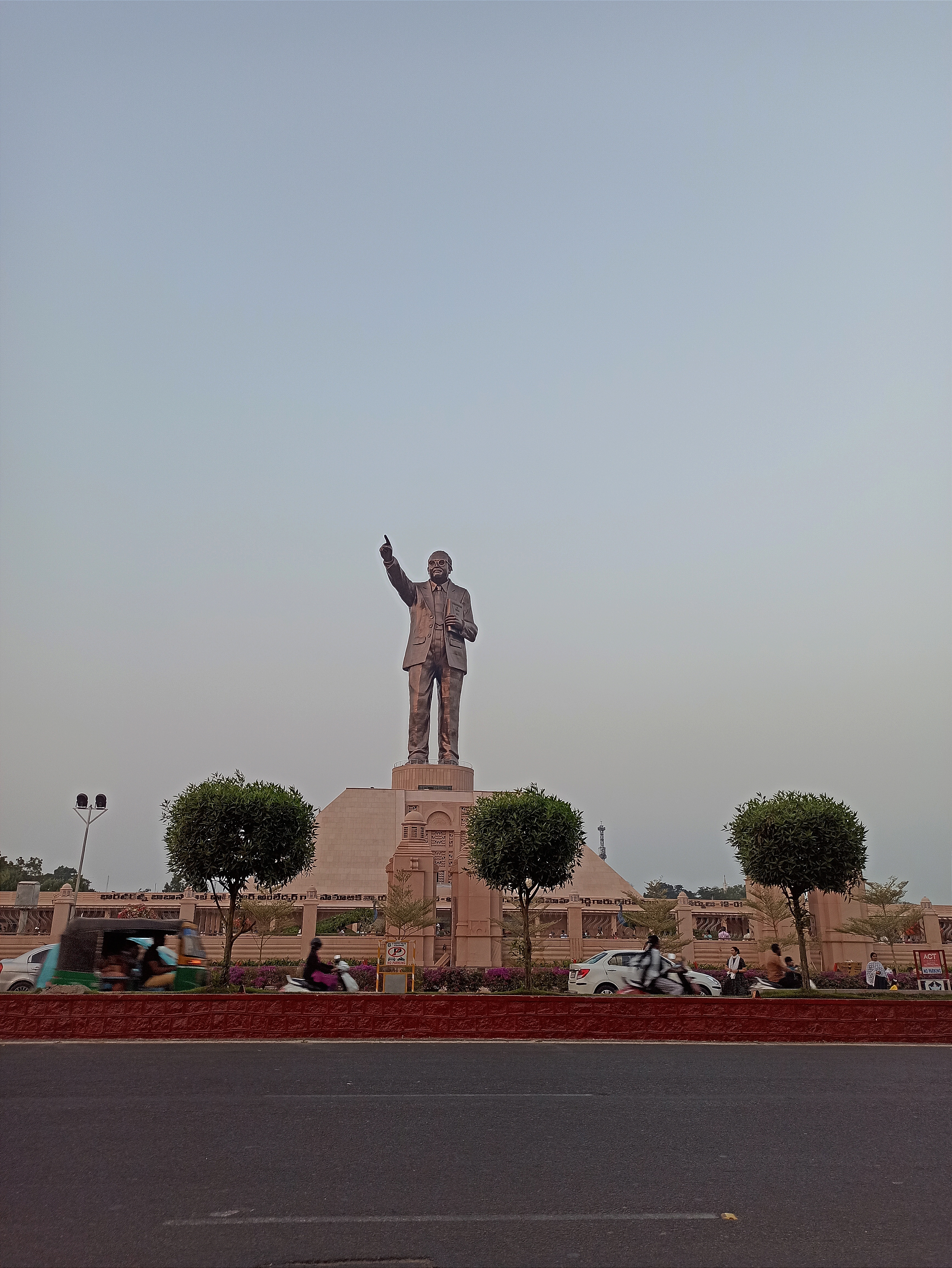
Statue of Social Justice

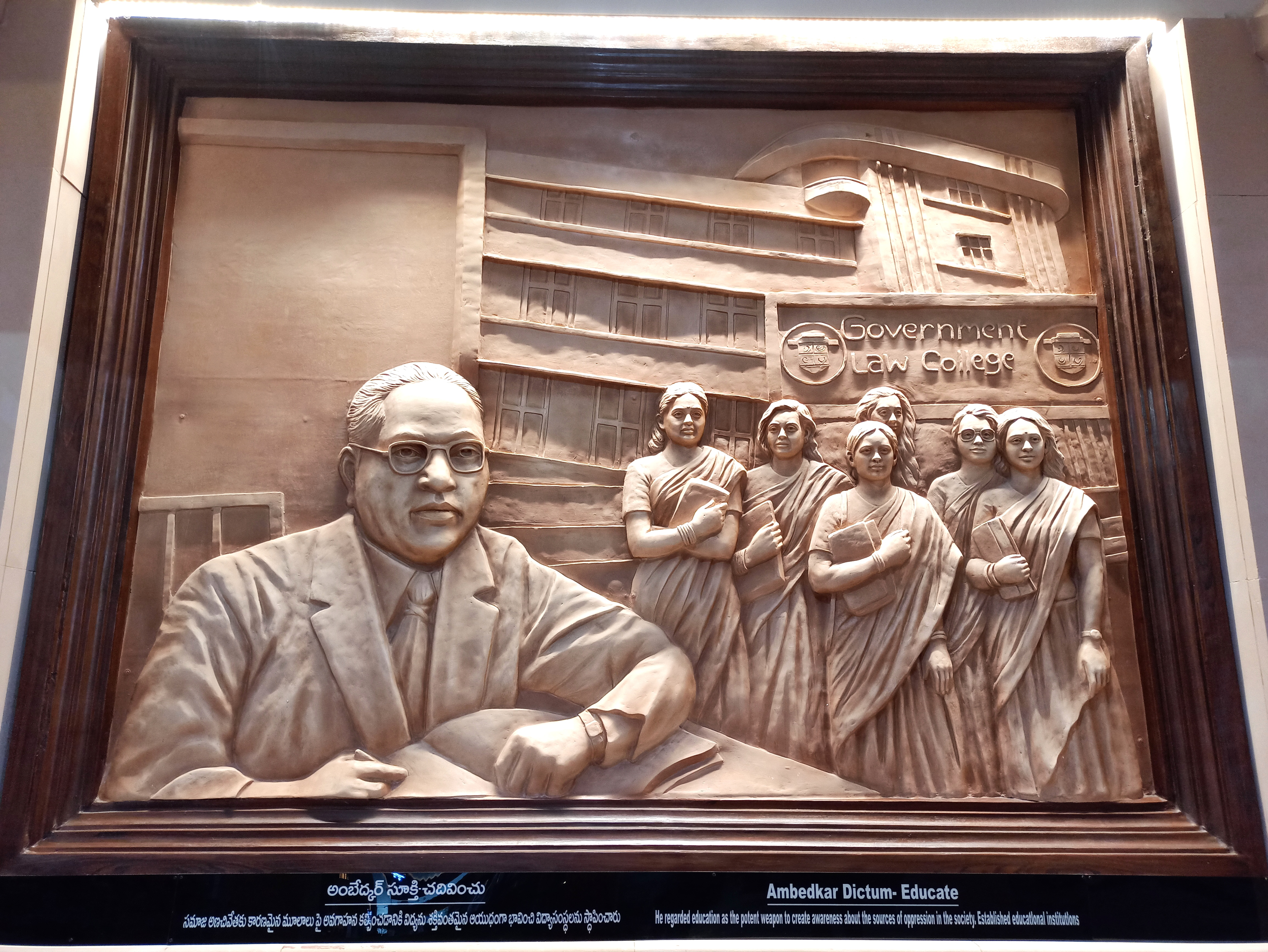
Statue of Social Justice

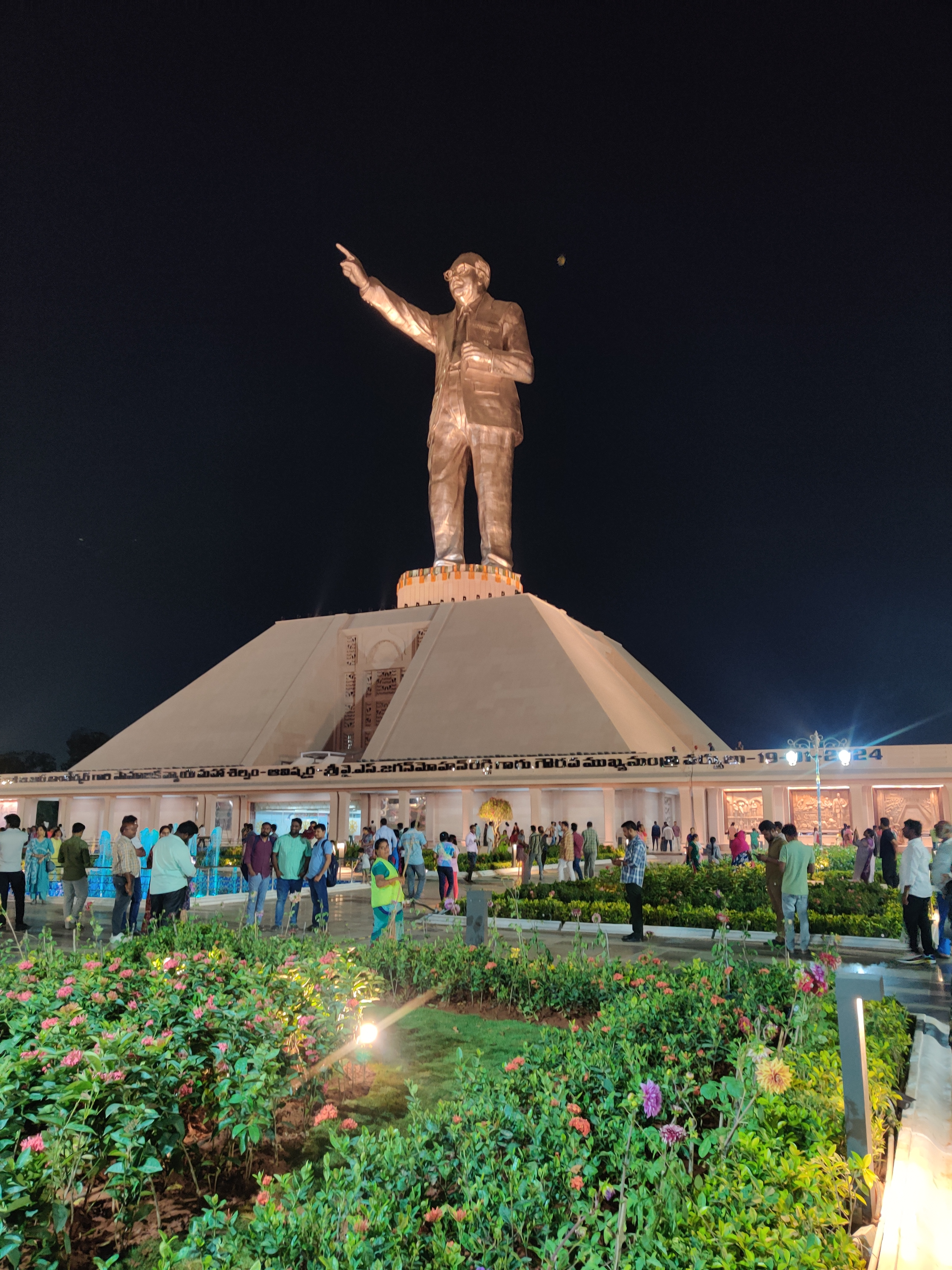
Statue of Social Justice at night view

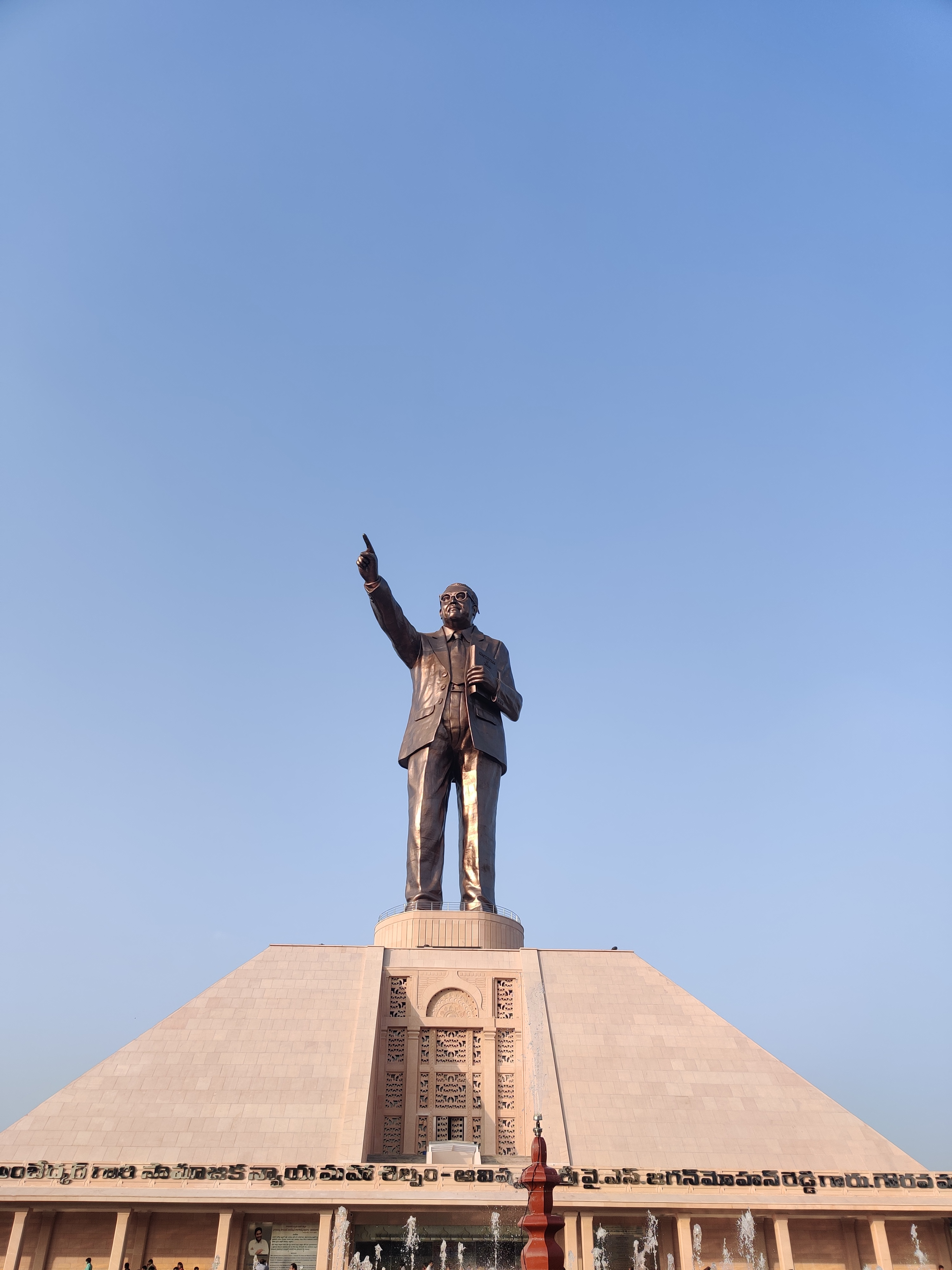
Statue of Social Justice

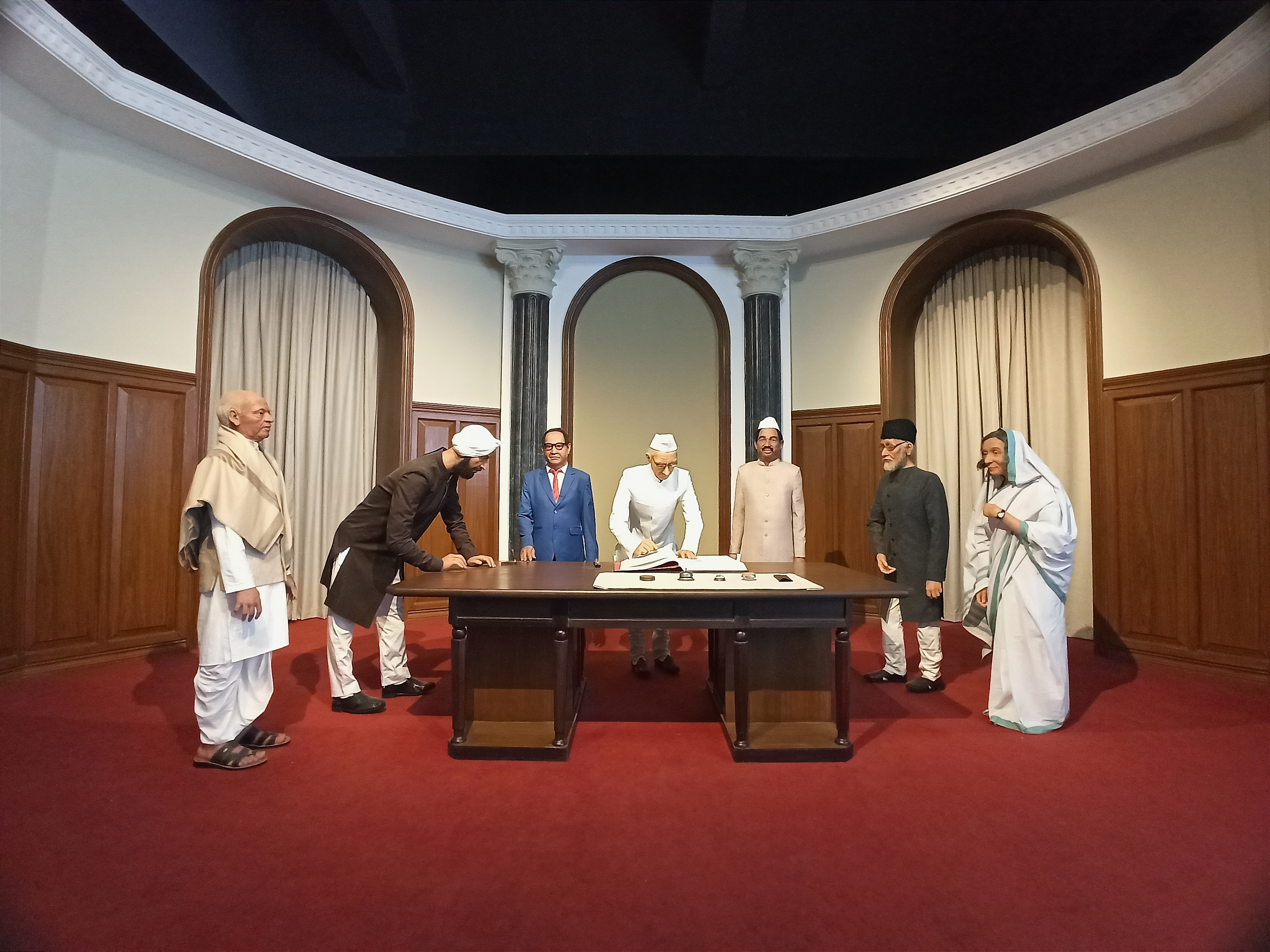
Statue of Social Justice

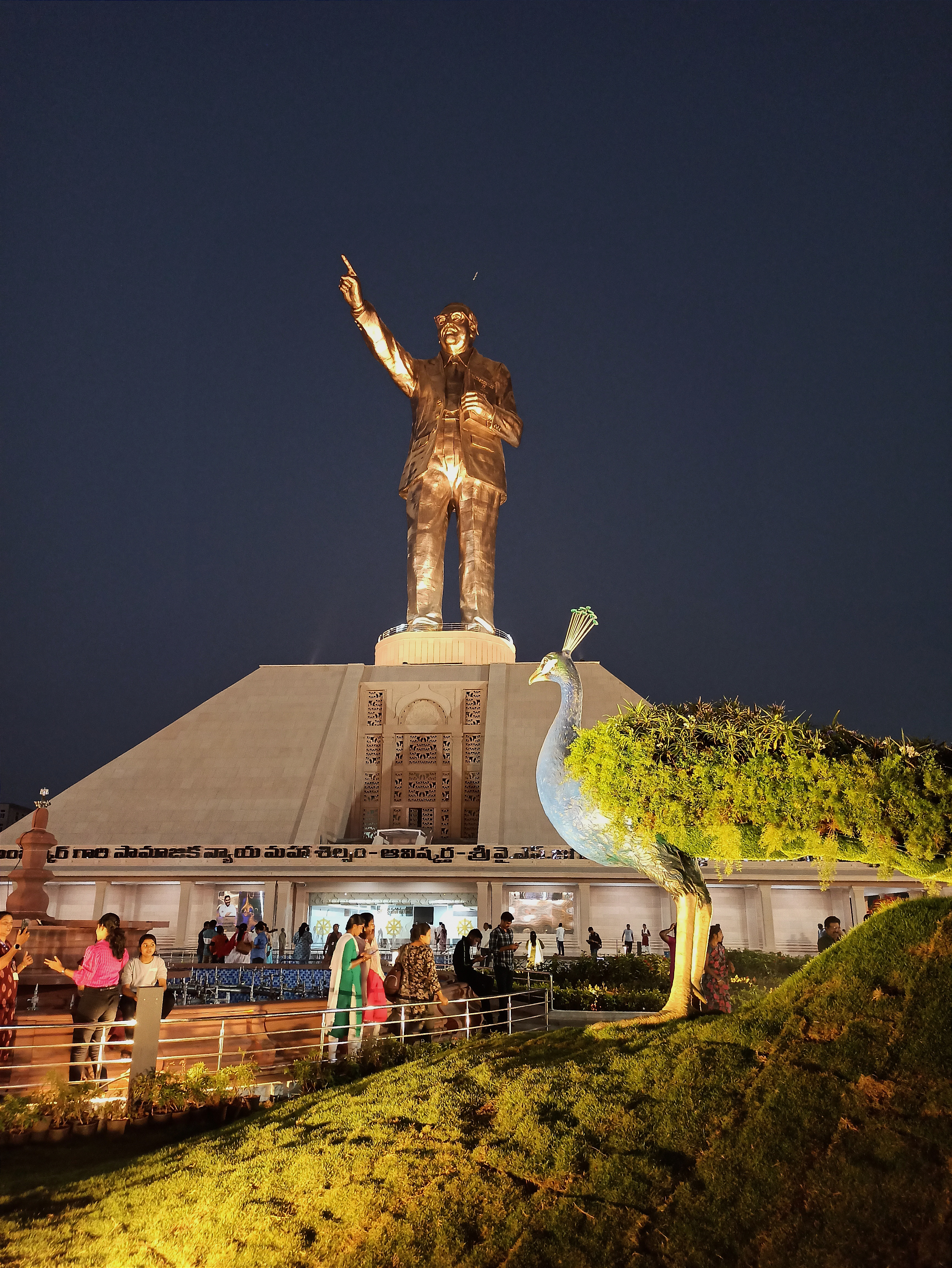
Statue of Social Justice

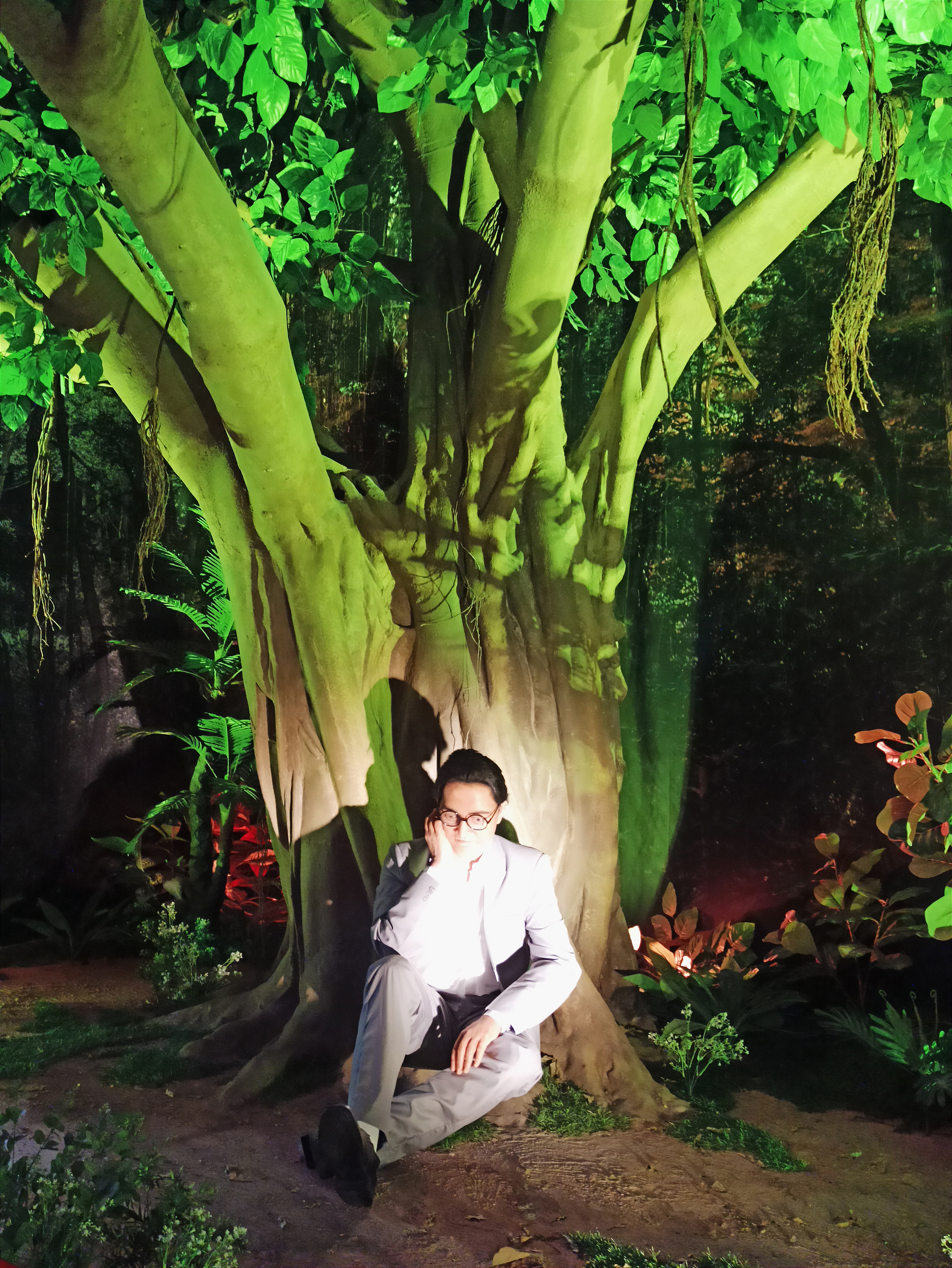

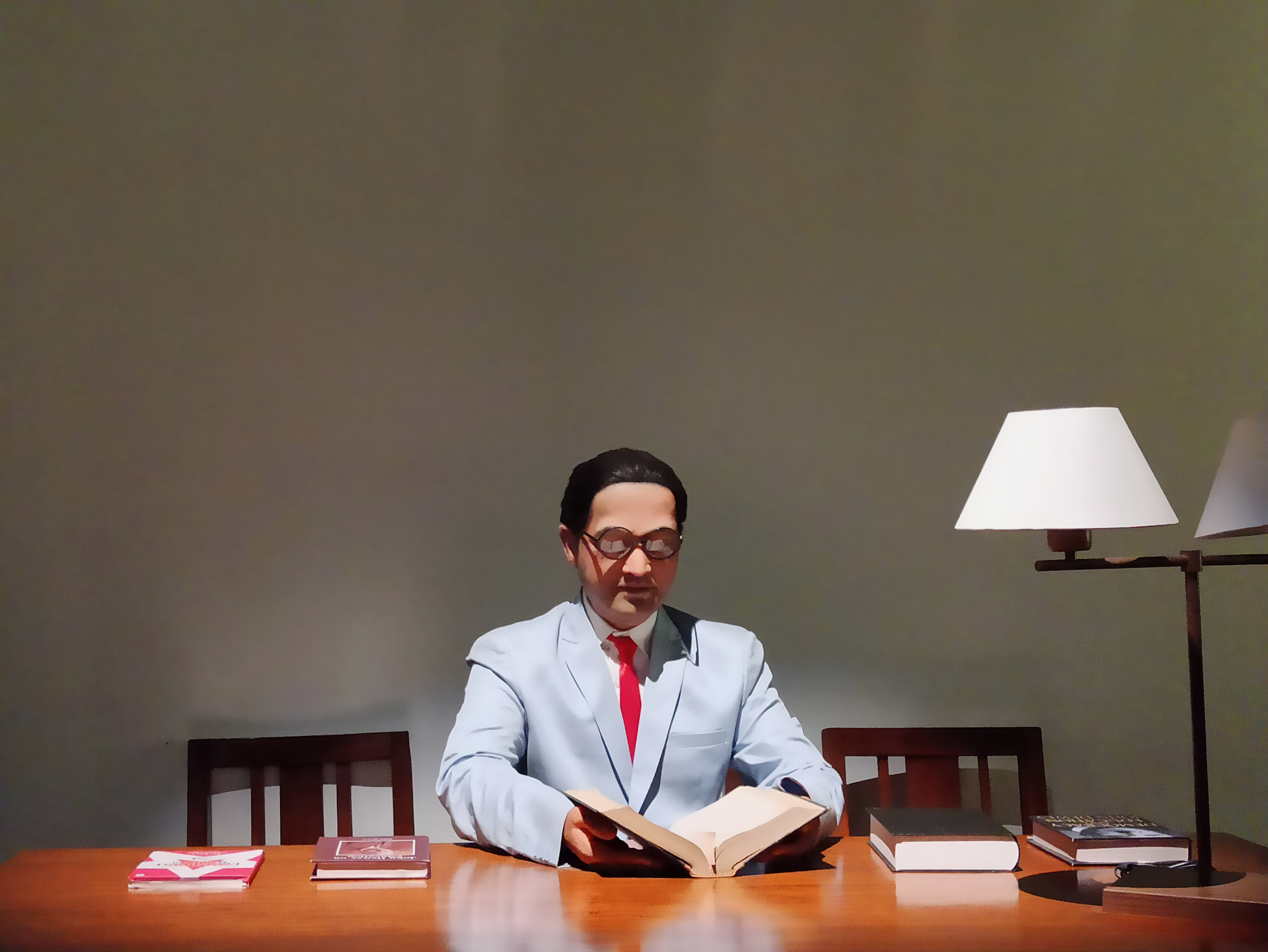

== See also ==
- List of things named after B. R. Ambedkar
- B. R. Ambedkar statue, Hyderabad
- List of tallest statues
- Ambedkar Memorial Park
- Dr. Ambedkar National Memorial
- Statue of Equality
