= Statue of Equality (Ambedkar) =

Dr. Babasaheb Ambedkar Memorial, Mumbai

- Dr. Babasaheb Ambedkar Memorial
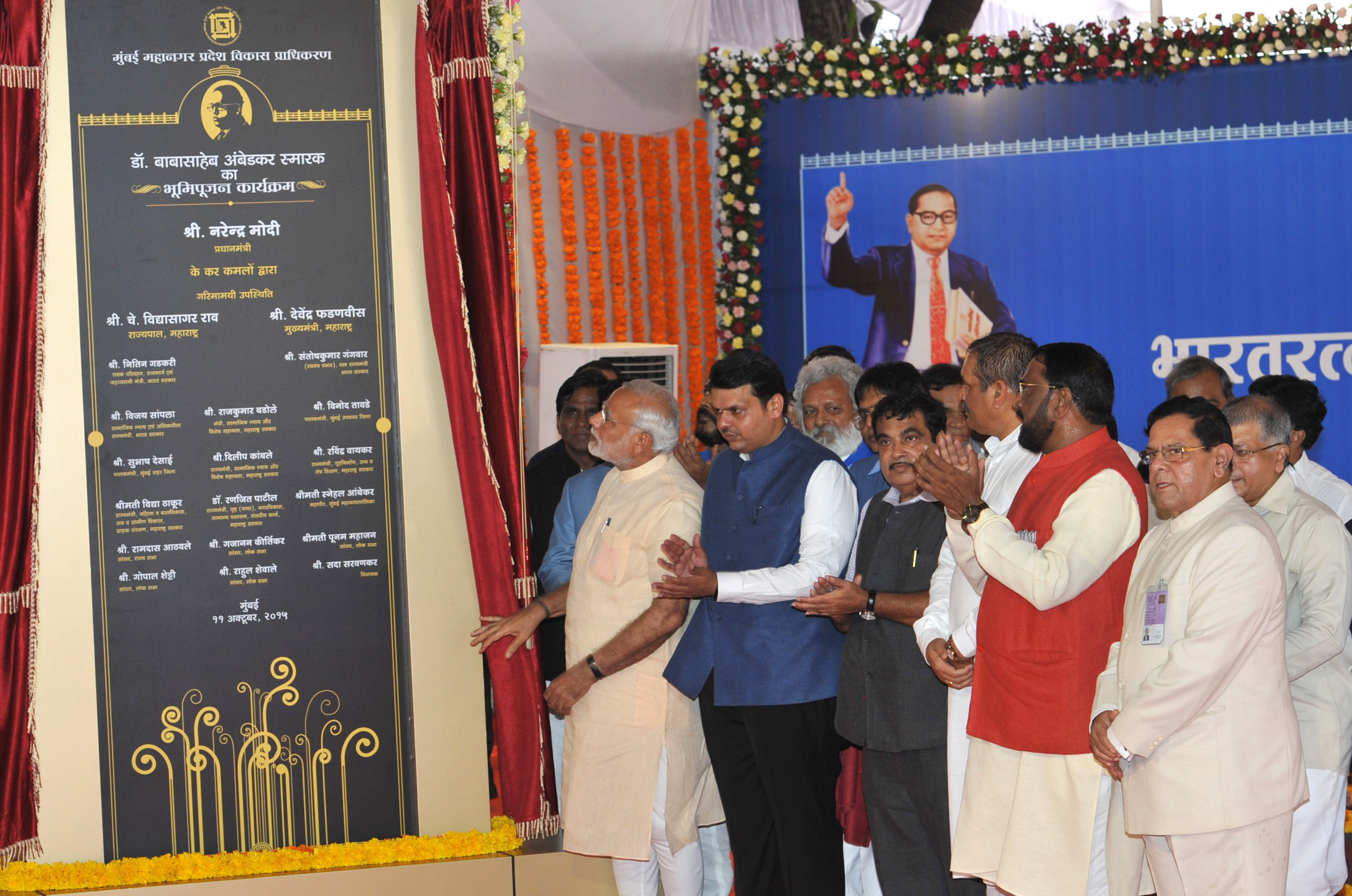
- PM Narendra Modi unveiling a plaque to mark the laying of Foundation Stone of Dr. Babasaheb Ambedkar Memorial (Statue of Equality), at Indu Mills Compound, Mumbai on 11 October 2015.
- Location: Indu Mills Compound, Prabhadevi, Dadar, Mumbai, Maharashtra, India
- Designer: Shashi Prabhu; Ram V. Sutar
- Height: 137.3 metres (450 ft)
- Beginning date: (contract for the construction of the statue was awarded on 10 March 2018)
- Completion date: November 2026 (50% work completed as of 7 December 2022)
- Dedicated to: Dr. B. R. Ambedkar

The Statue of Equality also known as the Dr. Babasaheb Ambedkar Memorial is a monument under-construction dedicated to B. R. Ambedkar, the 20th-century Indian intellectual. The statue will be located at Indu Mills Compound in Mumbai in the state of Maharashtra. The statue will be 137.3-metre (450 ft) in total height, including a 30.5-metre (100 ft) pedestal. The Ambedkar statue will be the third tallest statue in the world after the Statue of Unity (182 m) and the Spring Temple Buddha (153 m). The statue will be completed in November 2026.

== History ==
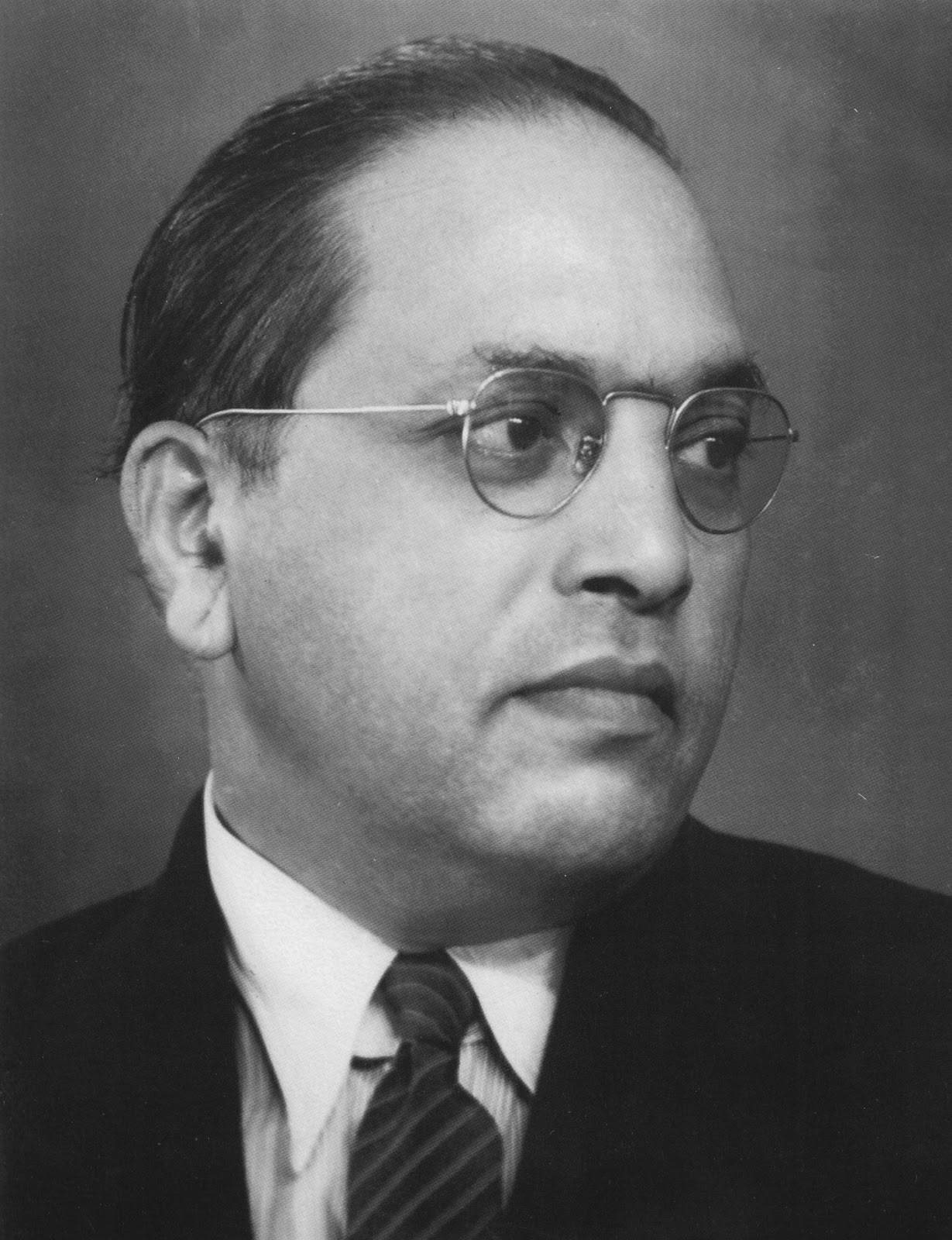
The memorial will be dedicated to B. R. Ambedkar

It is to be situated on property formerly owned by National Textile Corporation known as Indu Mills (India United Mill No. 6) in Dadar. The land is now owned by the Government of Maharashtra. The foundation stone was laid on 11 October 2015 by Prime Minister Narendra Modi. Construction proper was to start in November 2015, but as of November 2017 the project had not been assigned to a construction contractor, due to only one bid being submitted back then.

On 10 March 2018, newspapers in India reported that the contract for the construction of the statue had been awarded to the Shapoorji Pallonji Group at a cost of ₹783 crores.

== Structure of memorial ==
The main entrance to the structure would be from the adjacent Cadell Road with SKS Marg as the secondary access point. The memorial will be linked with Chaitya Bhoomi for easy movement of crowds. The memorial will cost ₹425 crore (US$44 million) at 12-acre erstwhile Indu Mill land. Its main attraction will be a 25,000 sq ft stupa around a pond. A dome-like structure with 24 stone ribs will be in the middle of plot. There will be an Ashoka Chakra covering the memorial structure. There will also be a proposed 39,622 square feet interactive museum displaying several aspects of Baba Saheb Dr. Ambedkar's life. The memorial will have a facility to park around 400 vehicles.

=== Stupa ===
The stupa would be the most expensive part at ₹110.95 crore (US$12 million). It will be 140 feet (43 m) tall with a circumference of 110 metres (360 ft). It will have a ribbed ceiling thus resembling the Buddhist Chaityas. An eight-tier bronze canopy representing the Buddha's eight-fold path at the top of the stupa in a built-up area of 2,400 square metres with a lotus pond at the foot of the dome.

=== Vipassana Hall ===
There is also a proposed Vipassanā (meditation) Hall at the memorial with a seating capacity for 13,000 people.

=== Gallery of Struggle ===
The Gallery of Struggle will depict momentous events associated with the life and work of Ambedkar, alongside 50,000 square feet library.

== Controversy ==
After the foundation stone was laid, some members of Ambedkar's family—his grandsons Prakash Ambedkar and Anandraj Ambedkar—together with Ambedkarites leaders from Maharashtra said they were unhappy with the design of the memorial. Some had concerns over the practical details of the design while others thought the memorial was not befitting the stature of Ambedkar.

Prakash Ambedkar pressed for the memorial to have a "think tank institution", an intellectual centre of international standards for scholars across the globe come for intellectual activity as his grandfather was an intellectual giant who contributed to many fields different many ways. Anandraj Ambedkar also suggested a design to the state government which was not considered as his design consisted of a 360-feet tall statue of his grandfather, Statue of Equality. The design right now looks more like a joggers’ park than a memorial. Leaders demanded government to set up a technical committee of experts on Buddhism, reputed architects from different Buddhist countries, and well-known people from the construction industry before finalizing the memorial's design with inclusion of a State of Equality (a larger-than-life sculpture of Ambedkar facing the ocean like New York City's Statue of Liberty) so to form an impressive part of Mumbai's skyline and should be the first thing that visitors see when landing in Mumbai.

== See also ==
- List of tallest statues
- Statue of B. R. Ambedkar, Hyderabad
- Statue of Social Justice, Vijayawada
- Ambedkar Memorial Park
- Deekshabhoomi
- Shiv Smarak
