= Ambedkar Memorial Park =

Memorial in Uttar Pradesh, India

Dr. Bhimrao Ambedkar Samajik Parivartan Sthal
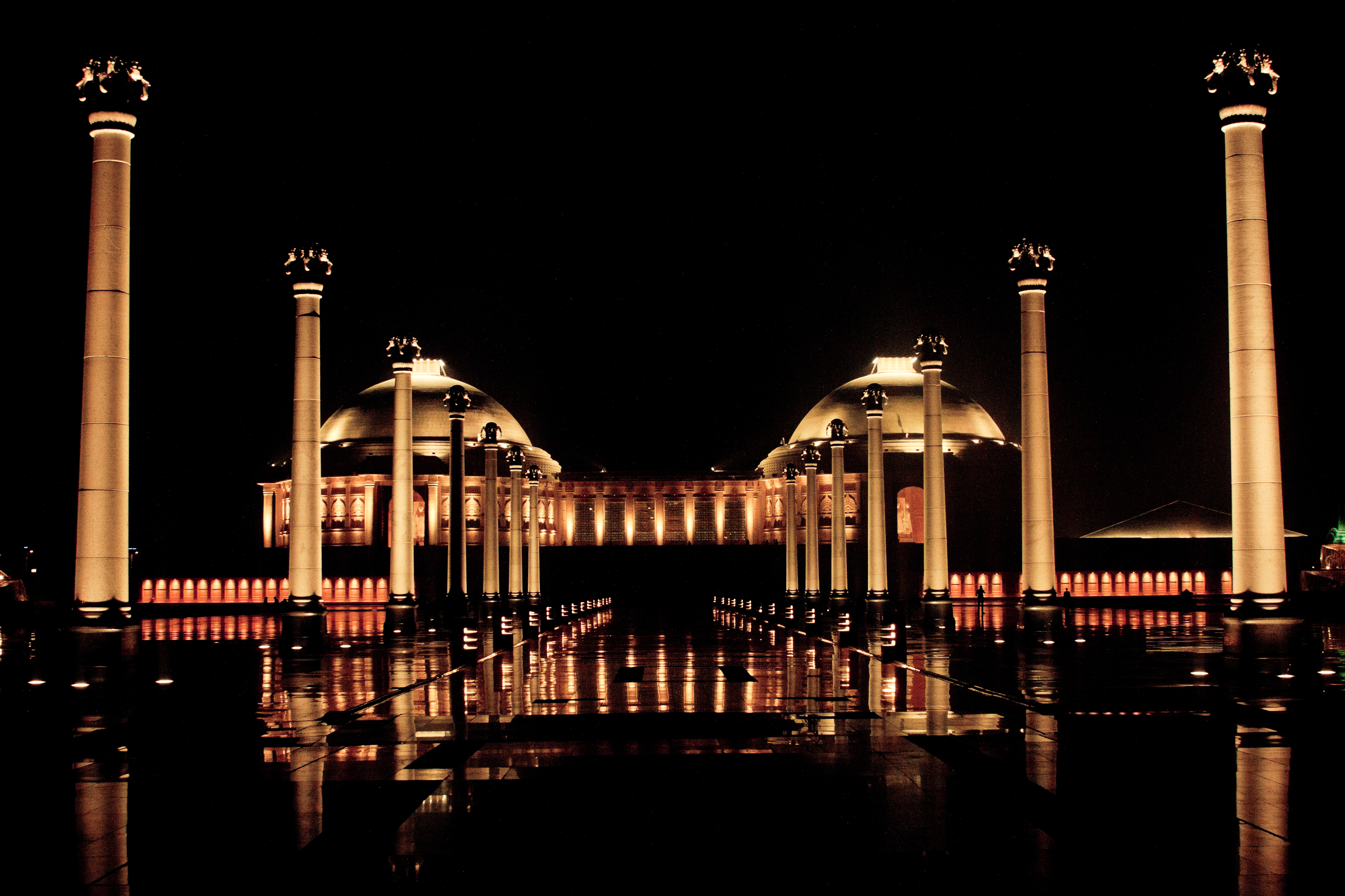
- Night view of the Dr. Bhimrao Ambedkar Samajik Parivartan Sthal
- Interactive map of Dr. Bhimrao Ambedkar Samajik Parivartan Sthal
- Type: Public, memorial
- Location: Gomti Nagar in Lucknow, Uttar Pradesh, India
- Coordinates: 26°50′56″N 80°58′40″E
- Area: 108 acres (44 ha)
- Opened: 14 April 2008; 18 years ago
- Founder: Mayawati
- Designer: Hafeez Contractor
- Operator: Lucknow Development Authority
- Open: 6 AM to 8 PM
- Status: Open year round
- Facilities: Parking; Waiting Room; Drinking Water; Toilet
- Website: https://smaraksamiti.org/dr-bhimrao-ambedkar-samajik-parivartan-sthal-internal/

Dr. Bhimrao Ambedkar Samajik Parivartan Sthal, (formerly Ambedkar Memorial Park) is a public memorial in Gomti Nagar, Lucknow, Uttar Pradesh, India. The memorial is dedicated to B. R. Ambedkar, an Indian jurist and the first Minister of Law and Justice of India.

The memorial also honours the lives and memories of Jyotirao Phule, Narayana Guru, Birsa Munda, Shahu of Kolhapur, and Kanshi Ram. The memorial also has 124 monumental elephants. The memorial was constructed by Mayawati, the former Chief Minister of Uttar Pradesh, during her administration when she led the Bahujan Samaj Party.

== History ==
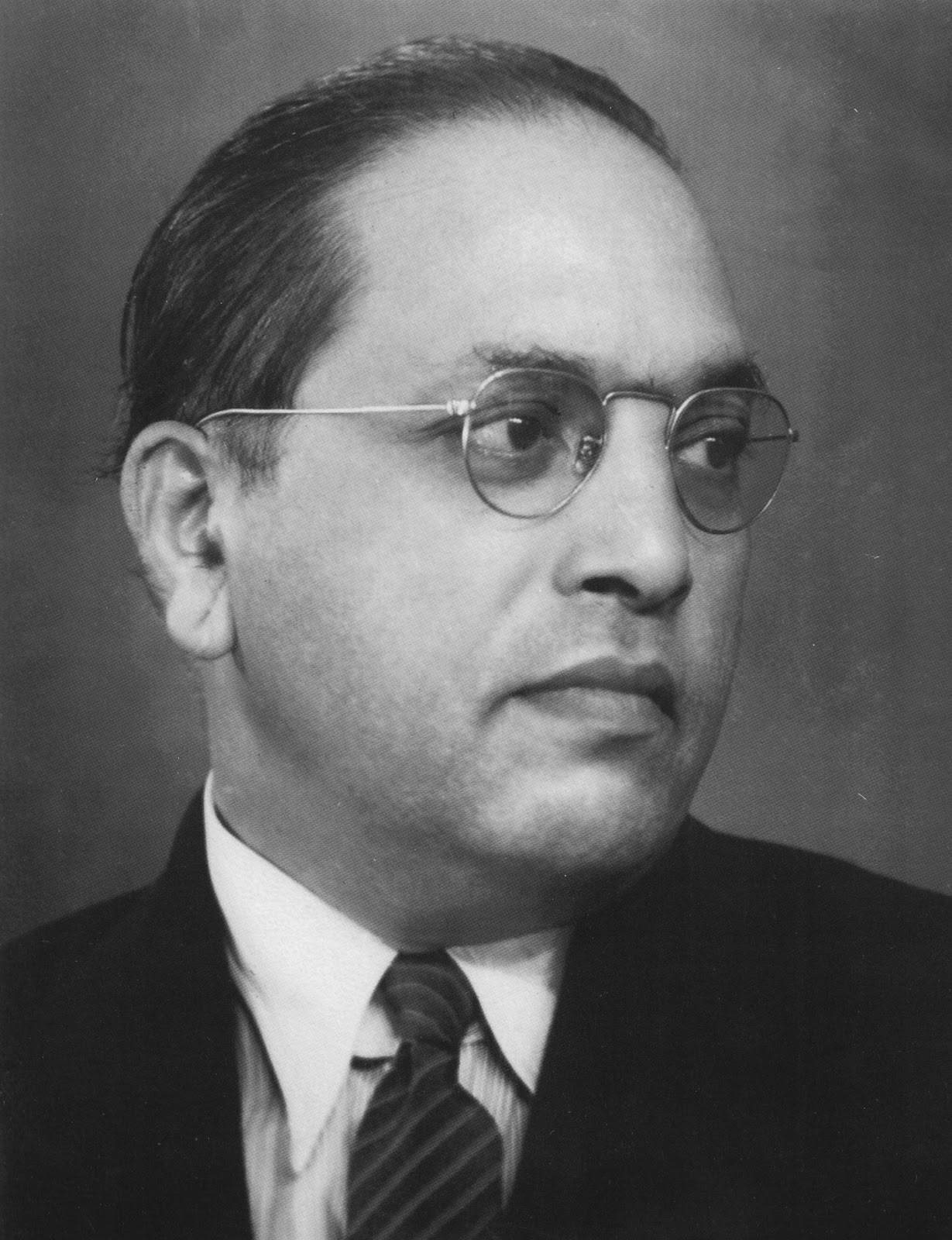
The memorial is dedicated to B. R. Ambedkar.

The foundation stone of the memorial was first laid in 1995. Earlier, the memorial was named Dr. Bhimrao Ambedkar Udyan. In 2002, it was renamed the Dr. Bhimrao Ambedkar Memorial and development work continued until 2002–03. In 2007, the memorial underwent further renovation and development. It was initially opened to the public on 14 April 2008 by Chief Minister of Uttar Pradesh Mayawati.

The entire memorial is built using red sandstone brought from Rajasthan. It is situated in the posh locality of Gomti Nagar, the largest planned residential colony in India. Cost of the memorial is estimated at 7 billion rupees. Its name was changed from Ambedkar Park to Bhimrao Ambedkar memorial in May 2012.

== Features ==
The memorial comprises several distinct zones and structures..

=== Ambedkar Stupa ===
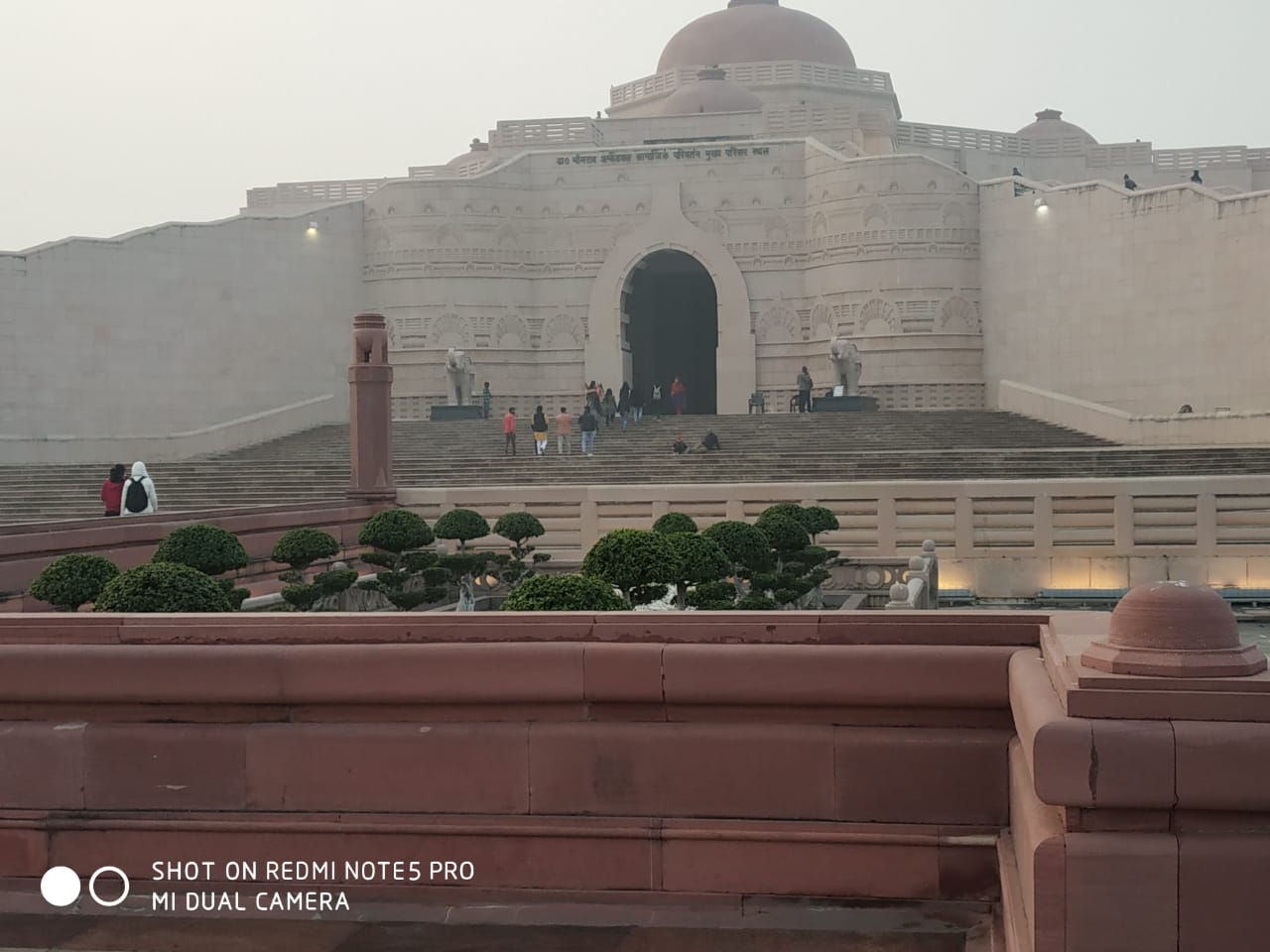
Front View of Ambedkar Stupa

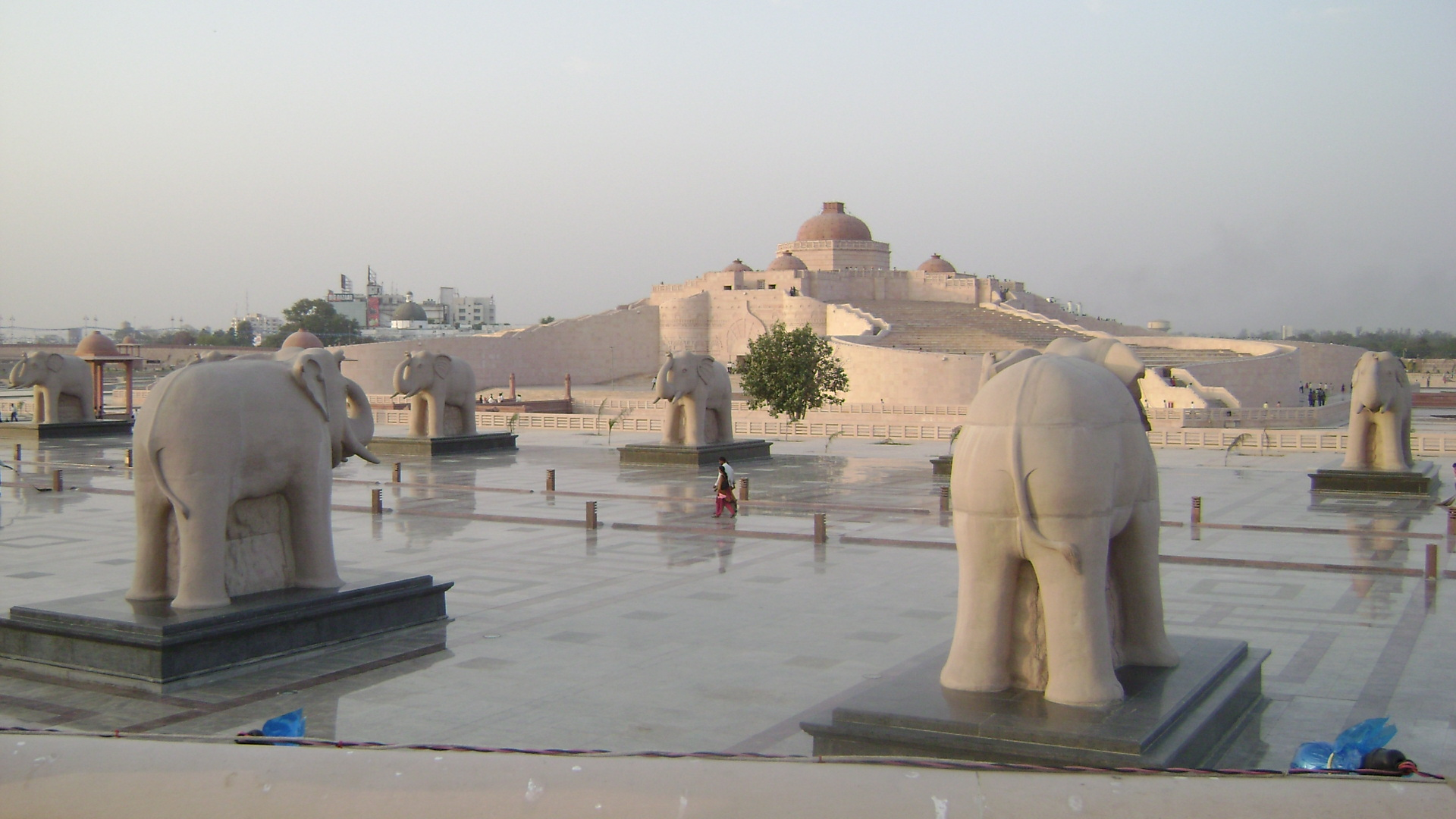
Ambedkar Stupa and elephants

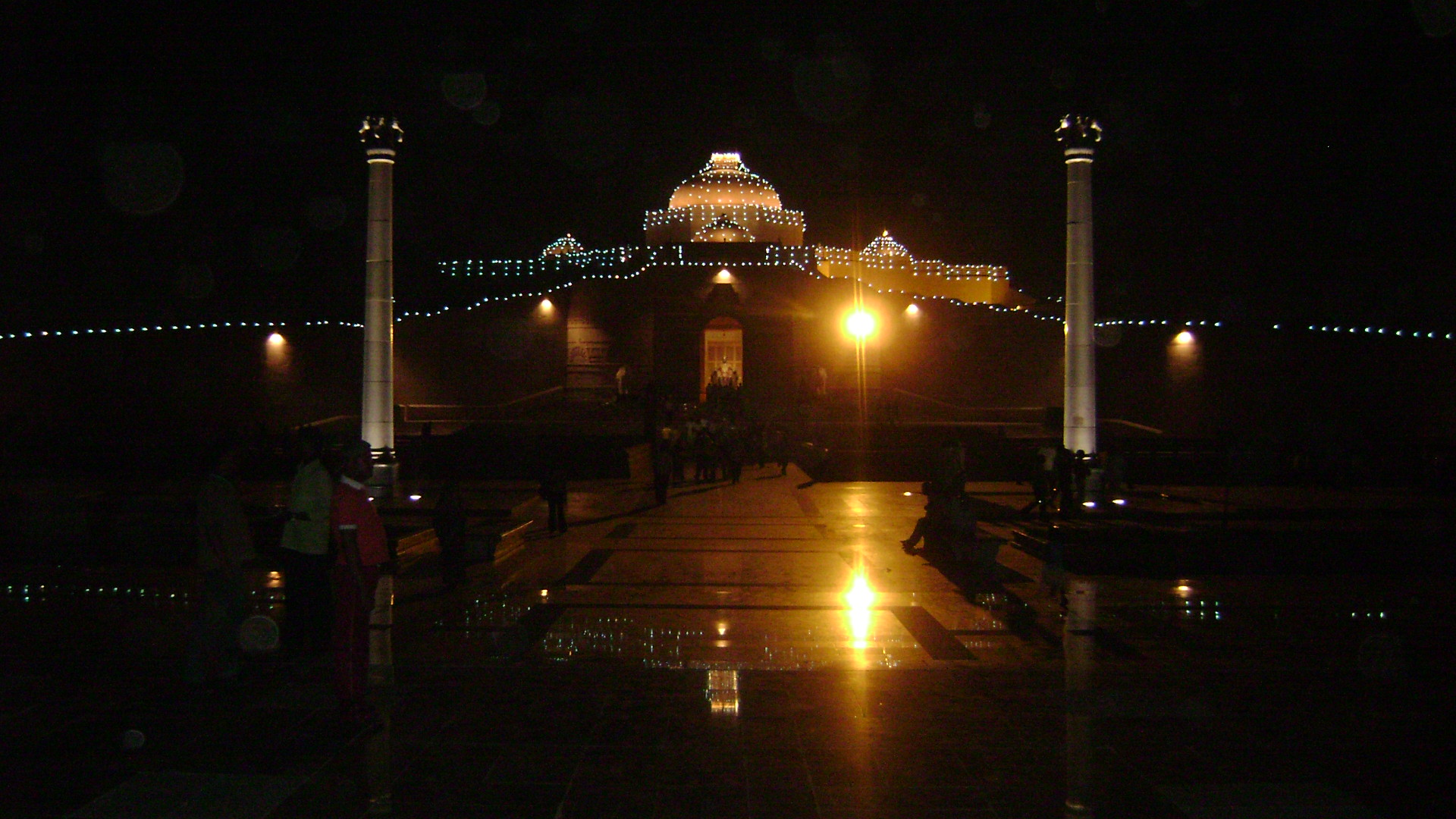
Ambedkar Stupa Night view

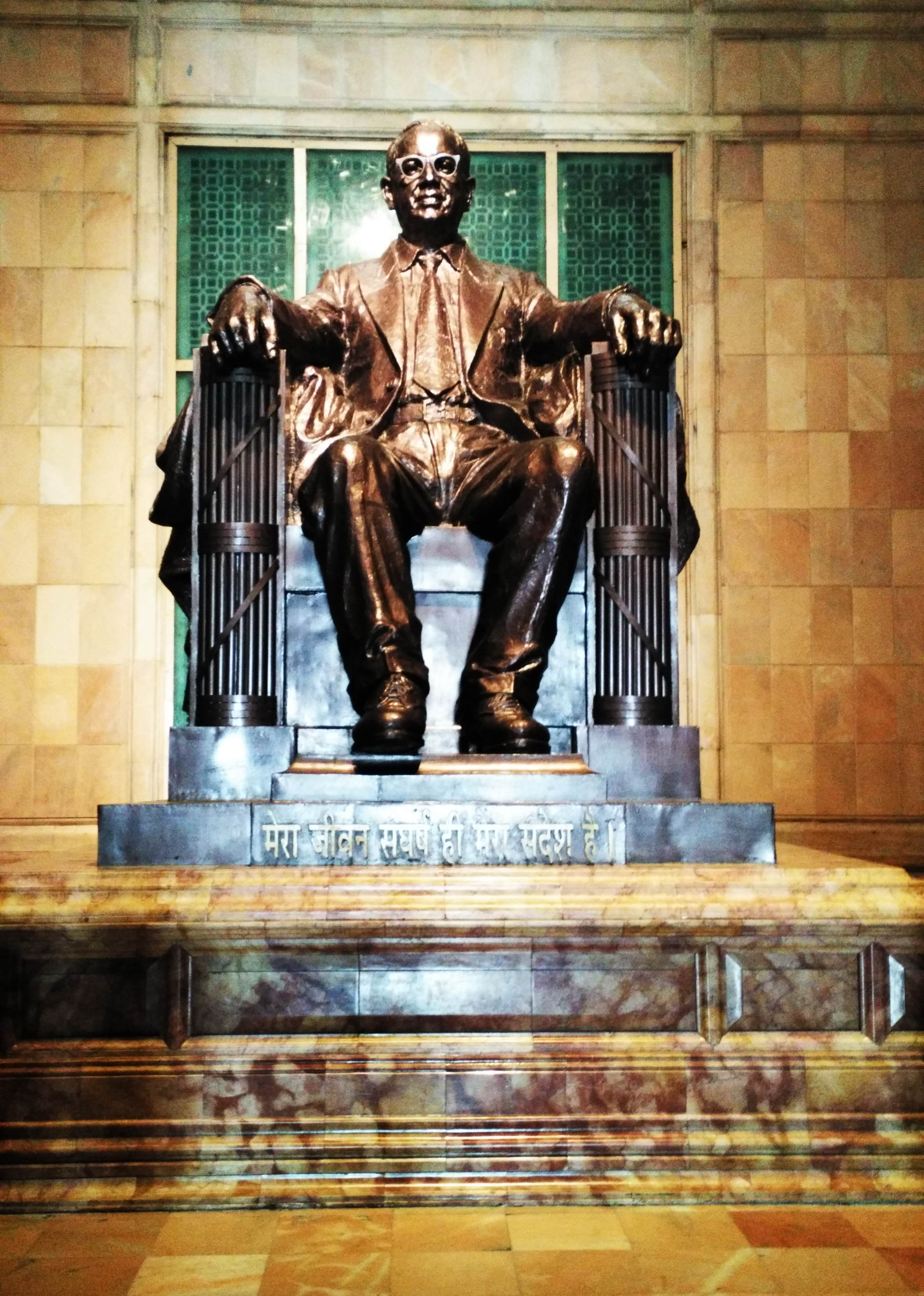
The bronze statue of Ambedkar in Ambedkar Memorial; the base is inscribed "My struggle of life is my only message." The Ambedkar statue was modelled on the sculpture of Abraham Lincoln at the Lincoln Memorial in Washington, D.C.

This construction is the heart of the entire memorial. The sanctum sanctorum consists of many statues depicting the biography of Ambedkar. There are four doors in opposite directions. This is a construction in the shape of a flower bearing four petals. There is a bronze statue of Ambedkar seated in a chair, facing towards the two domes. The Ambedkar statue was modelled on the sculpture of Abraham Lincoln at the Lincoln Memorial in Washington, D.C..

At the base of the statue a message in Hindi reads:

मेरा जीवन संघर्ष ही मेरा संदेश है

(Mera jeevan sangharsh hi mera sandesh hai)
My struggle of life is my only message.

=== Dr. Bhimrao Ambedkar Samajik Parivartan Sangrahalay ===
Opposite to the Dr. Bhimrao Ambedkar Memorial is the Sangrahalay (museum), constructed over an area of about 2.5 acre (11,008 sq.m.). The building has two domes on top. It contains large statues of Jyotirao Phule, Shahu of Kolhapur, Narayana Guru, B. R. Ambedkar and Kanshi Ram. Another building consists of 18-foot tall marble statues of Gautam Buddha, Kabir, Ravidas, Ghasidas and Birsa Munda.

=== Dr. Bhimrao Ambedkar Samajik Parivartan Gallery ===
Constructed in an area of 4 acres (16,207 sq.m.), this place has murals made of bronze.

=== Pratibimb Sthal ===
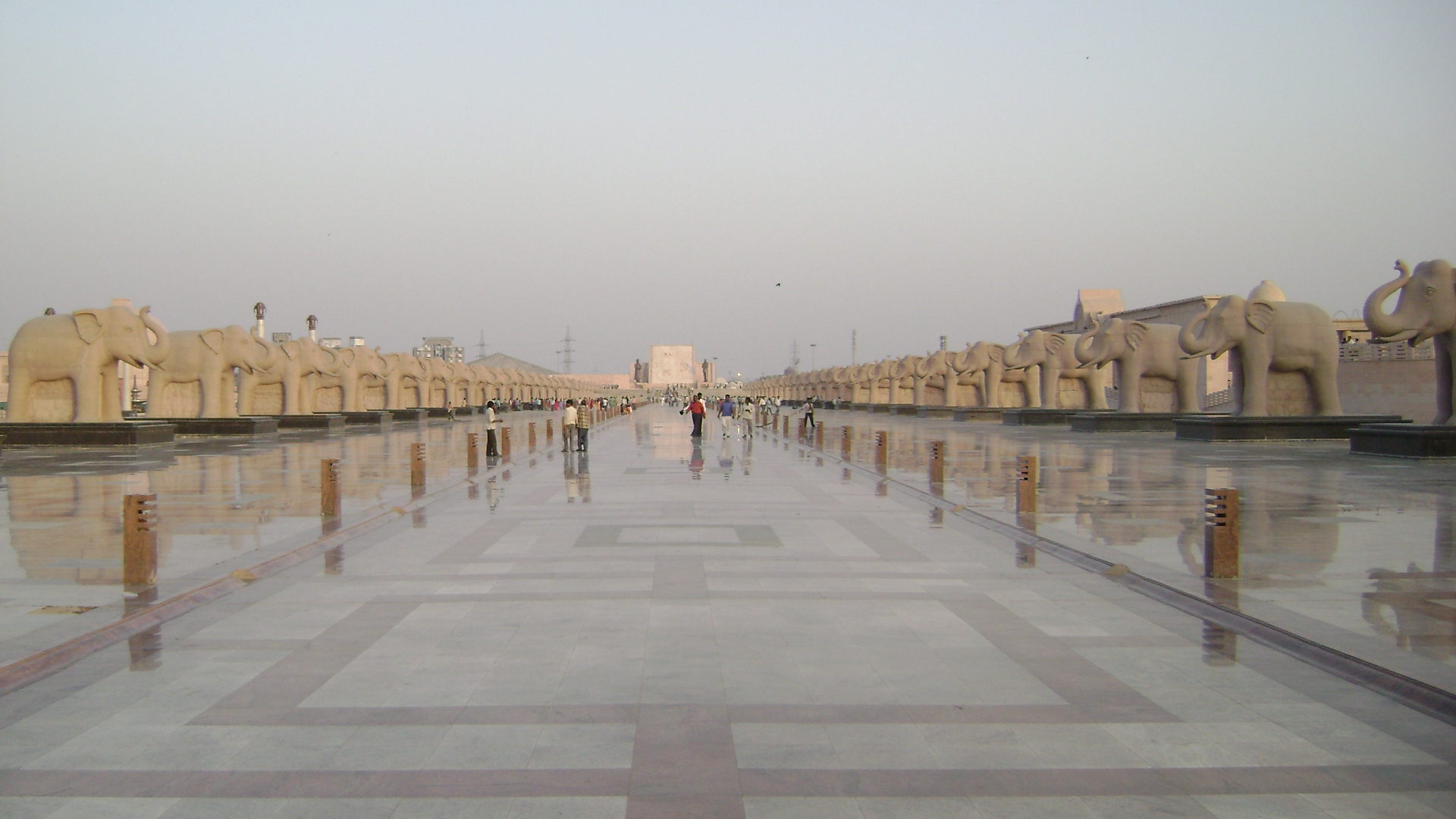
Pratibimb Sthal

Pratibimb Sthal is the main entrance to the memorial, flanked by 62 elephant statues on each side, totalling 124 elephants across the complex.

=== Dr. Bhimrao Ambedkar Memorial Drashya Sthal ===
Constructed on an 80-foot pyramid type structure on the back of Pratibimb Sthal, the Drashya Sthal offers a vantage point from where the memorial, shrines, structures and sites integrate as a view of the whole area. The flow of water from the top of the pyramid entertains visitors.

== Vandalism ==
On 26 July 2012 a statue in the memorial was damaged by members of a group calling themselves "Uttar Pradesh Nav Nirman Sena". A replacement statue was re-installed overnight by the Lucknow administration.

== Film shooting ==
In the Bollywood film Youngistaan (2014) actors Jackky Bhagnani and Neha Sharma shot in Ambedkar Memorial and were surprised with its vast scale. After permission for shooting outside the memorial in March 2014, Aditya Roy Kapur and Parineeti Chopra shot for "Rangreli" song of film Daawat-e-Ishq. In November 2015, Ravi Kishan shot for a Bhojpuri film at Ambedkar Memorial. In February 2016, Mika Singh and Urvashi Rautela also shot for their new music video named Lal Dupatta Kurta Chikan Ka just outside the Memorial In 2017, the song "Jogi" from the movie Shaadi Mein Zaroor Aana, starring Rajkumar Rao and Kriti Kharbanda was shot here. In 2017 small part of Movie Bareilly Ki Barfi starring Ayushman Khurrana, Rajkummar Rao and Kriti Sanon was also shot here.

== Legal issues ==
Since 2009 the memorial has been involved in a legal battle. In June 2009 the Supreme Court issued a stay against further building on the project, until the Public Interest Litigation (PIL) questioning these expenditure was settled. Despite initially denying even maintenance costs, in December 2010, Government of Uttar Pradesh received permission to perform maintenance and completion of the memorial.

On 2018, the Allahabad High Court asked Government of Uttar Pradesh to provide the status report on the vigilance department's investigation in connection with the alleged Rs 1,410 crore memorial scam involving this monument.

== Gallery ==
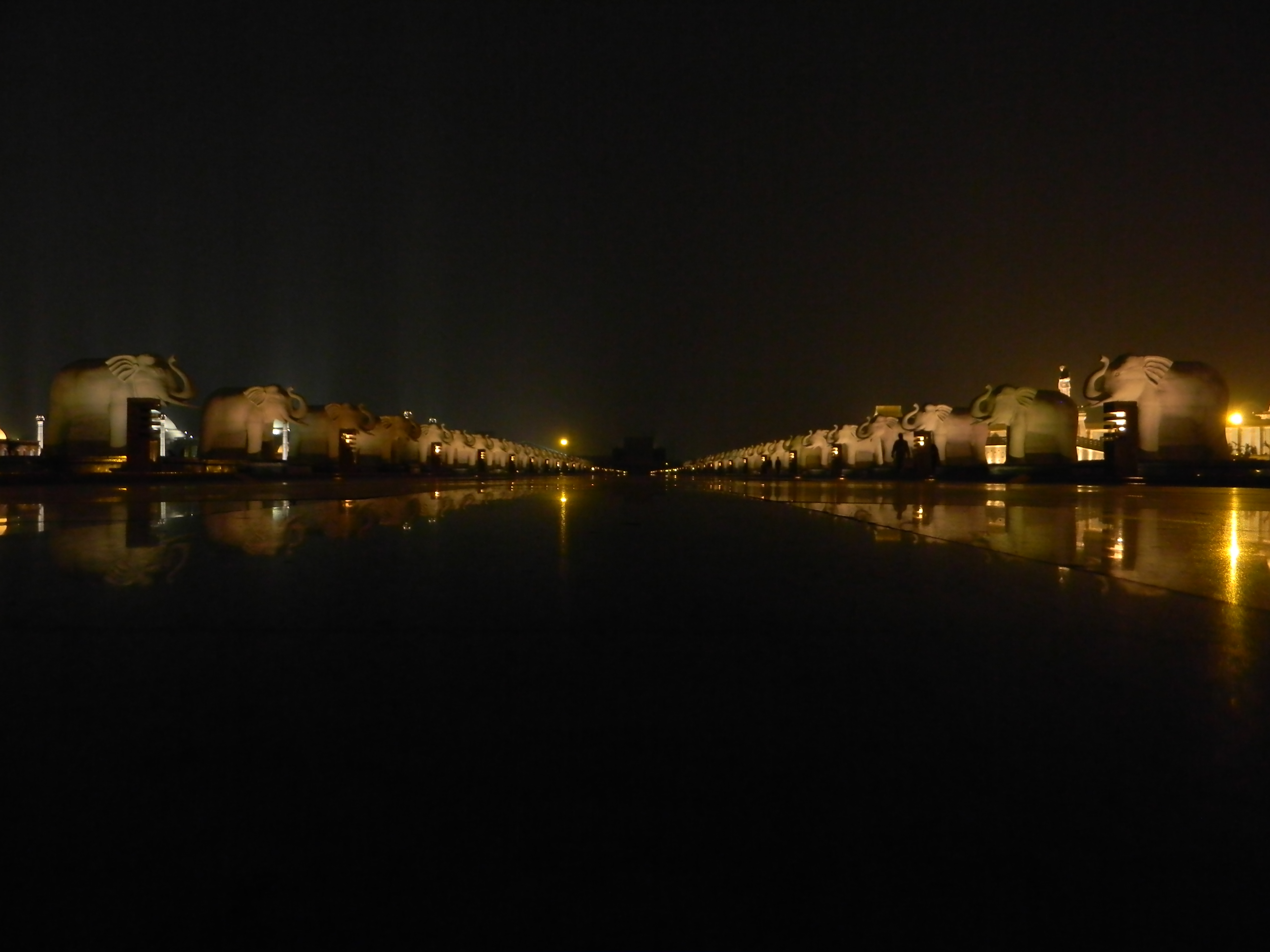
Inside view of Dr. Bhimrao Ambedkar Samajik Parivartan Sthal in Night

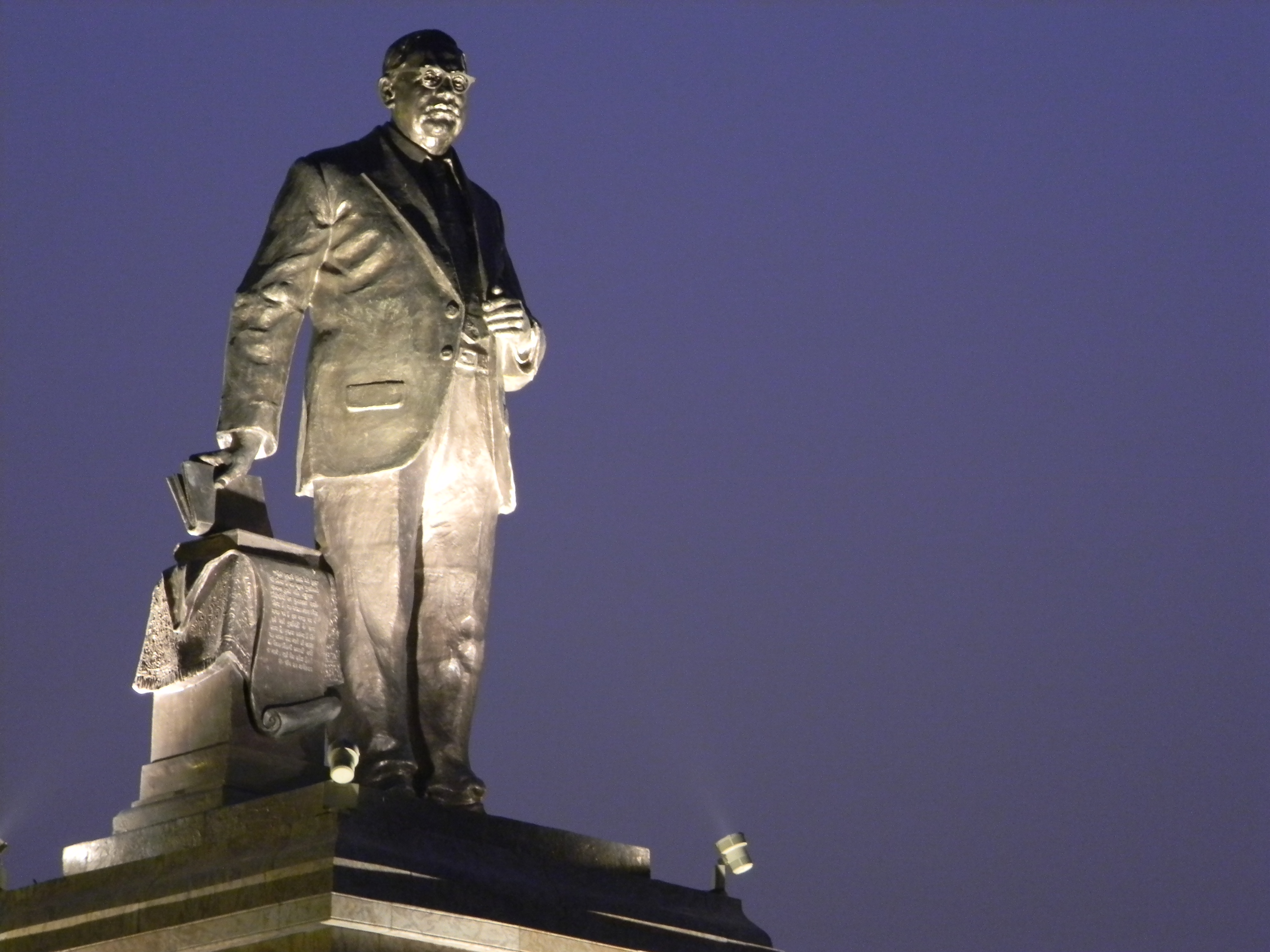
Statue of B.R. Ambedkar inside Dr. Bhimrao Ambedkar Samajik Parivartan Sthal, Lucknow

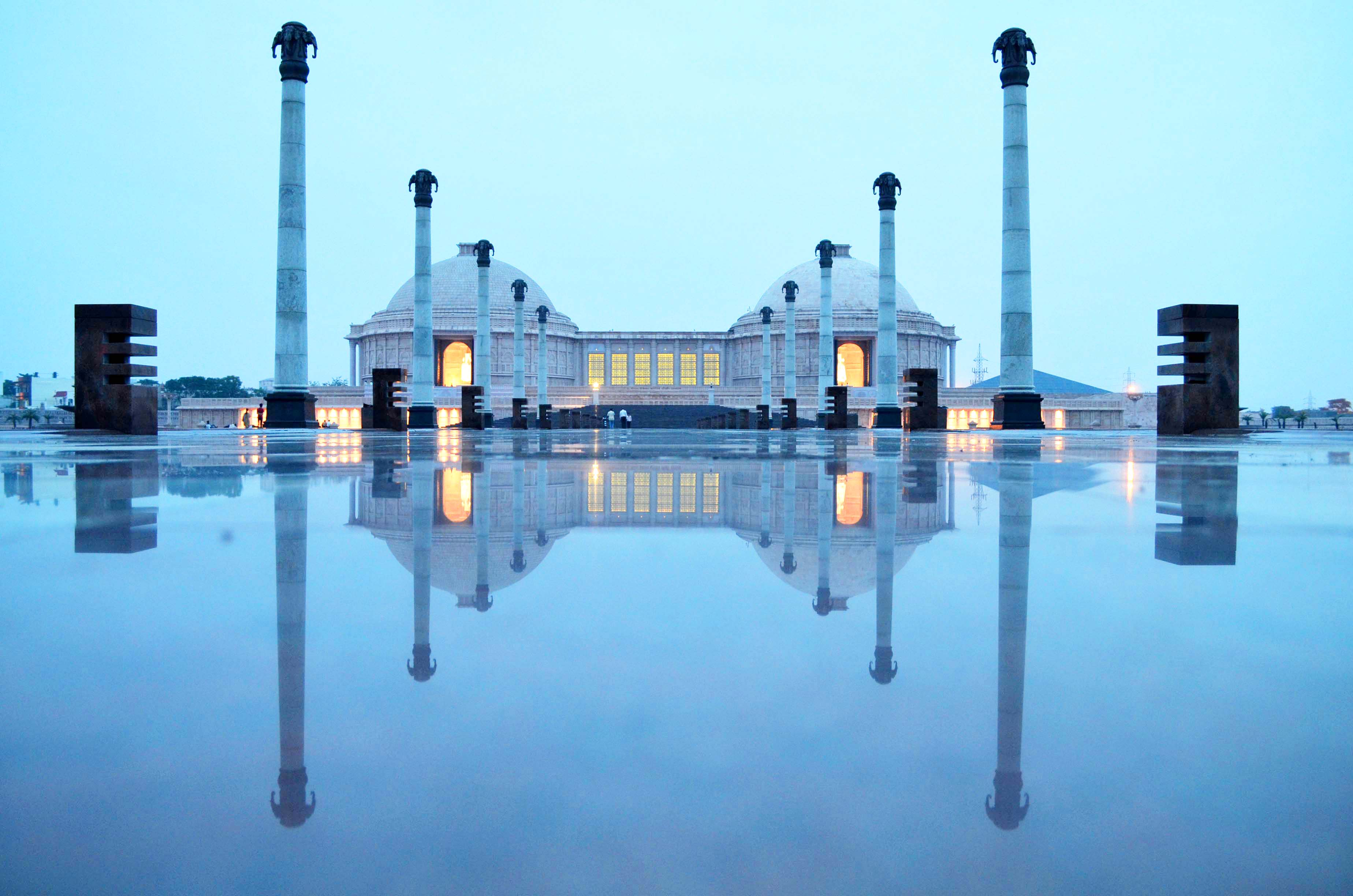
Morning View of Dr. Bhimrao Ambedkar Samajik Parivartan Sthal

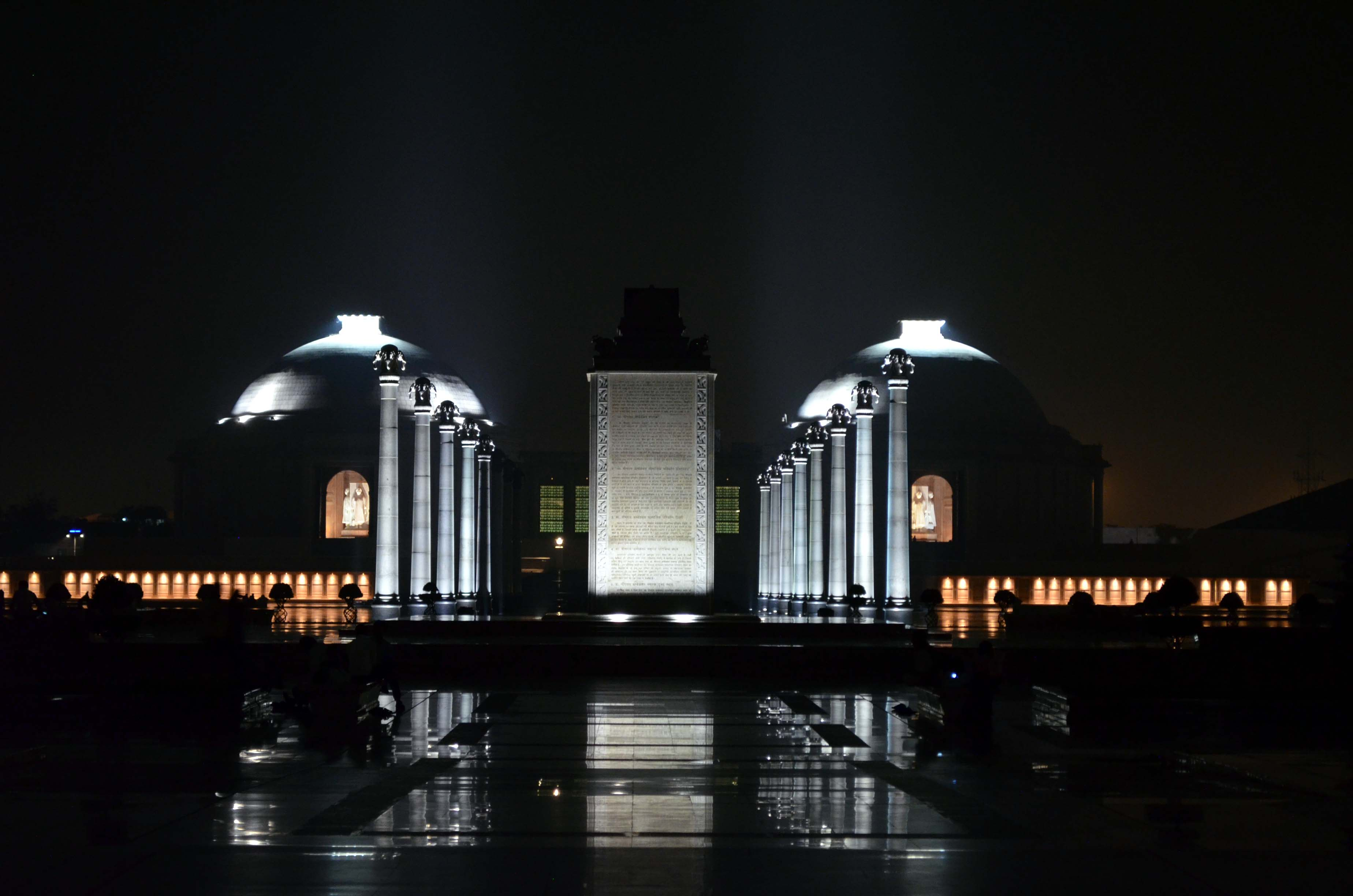
Night View

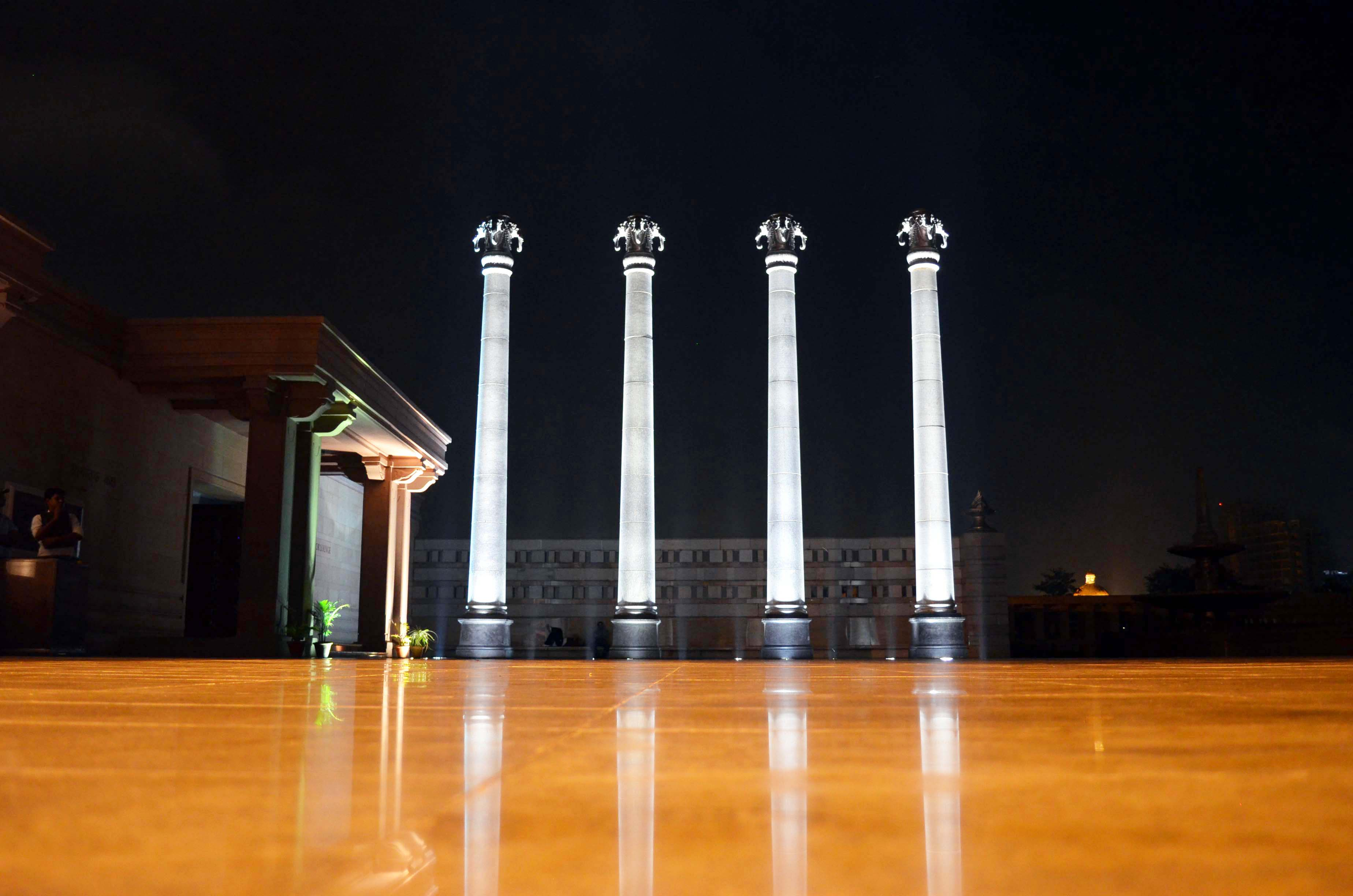
Pillars at Night View

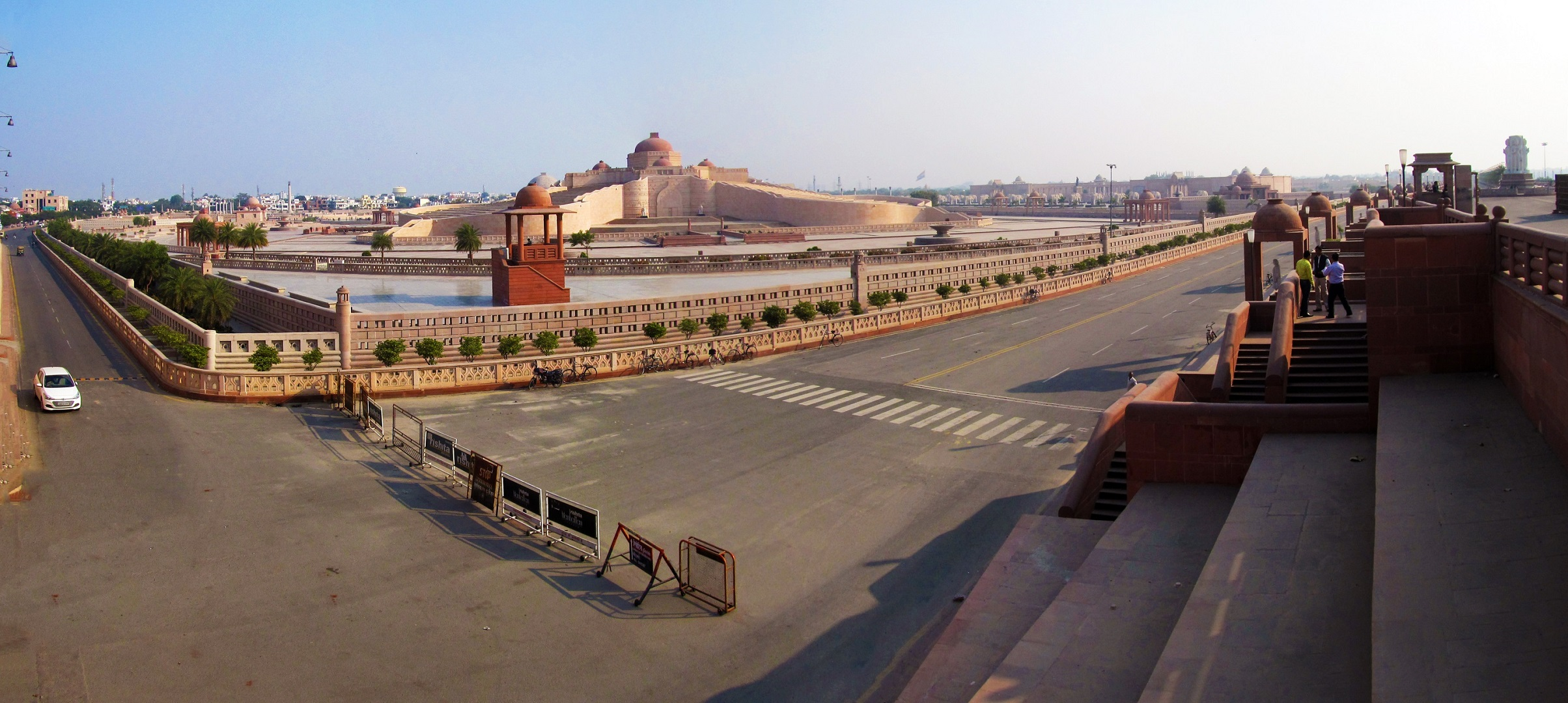
View from outside

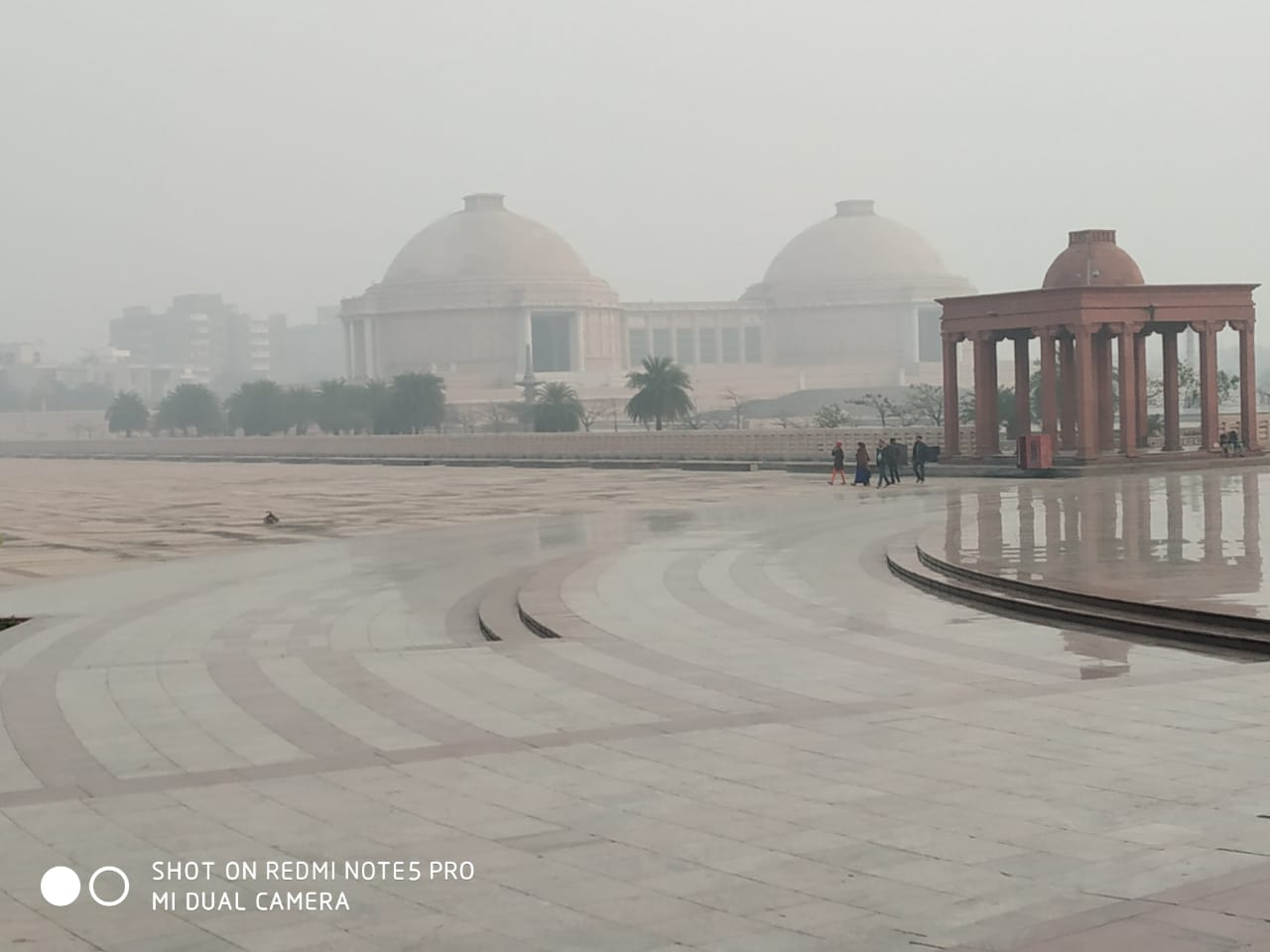
Middle View

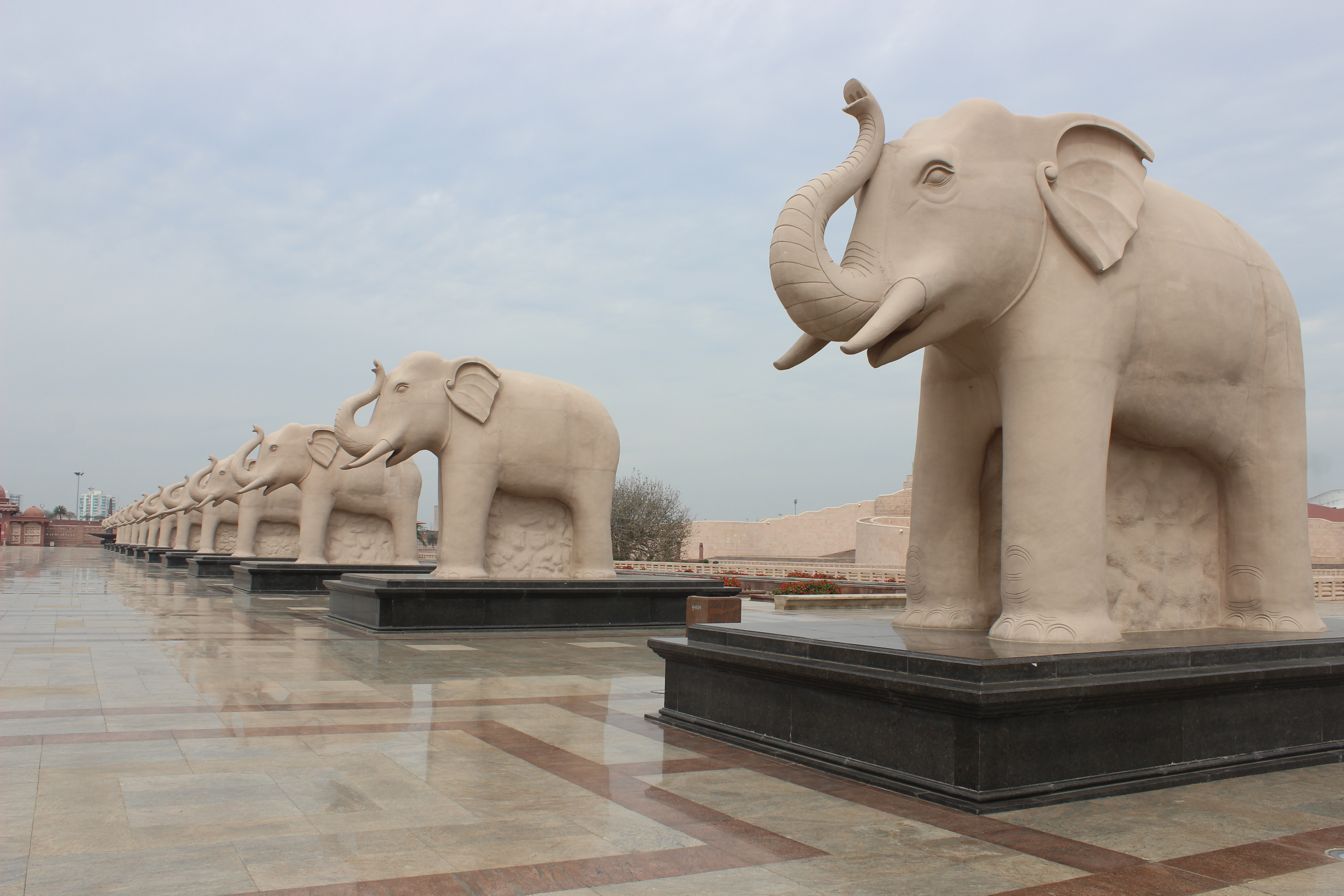
Dr. Bhimrao Ambedkar Samajik Parivartan Sthal, Lucknow, Uttar Pradesh

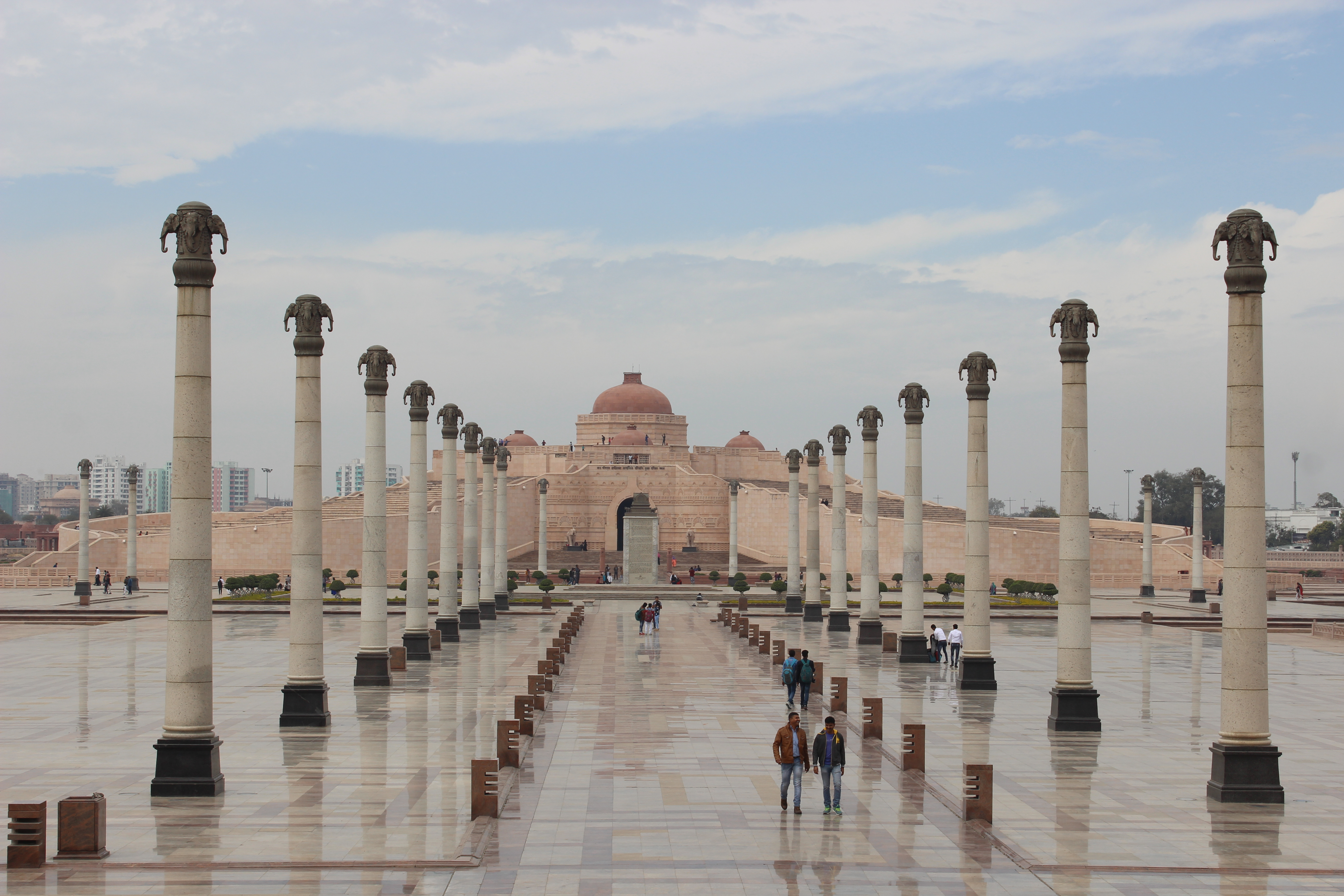
Dr. Bhimrao Ambedkar Samajik Parivartan Sthal, Lucknow, Uttar Pradesh

== See also ==
- Statue of Equality
- Statue of Unity
