= List of things named after B. R. Ambedkar =

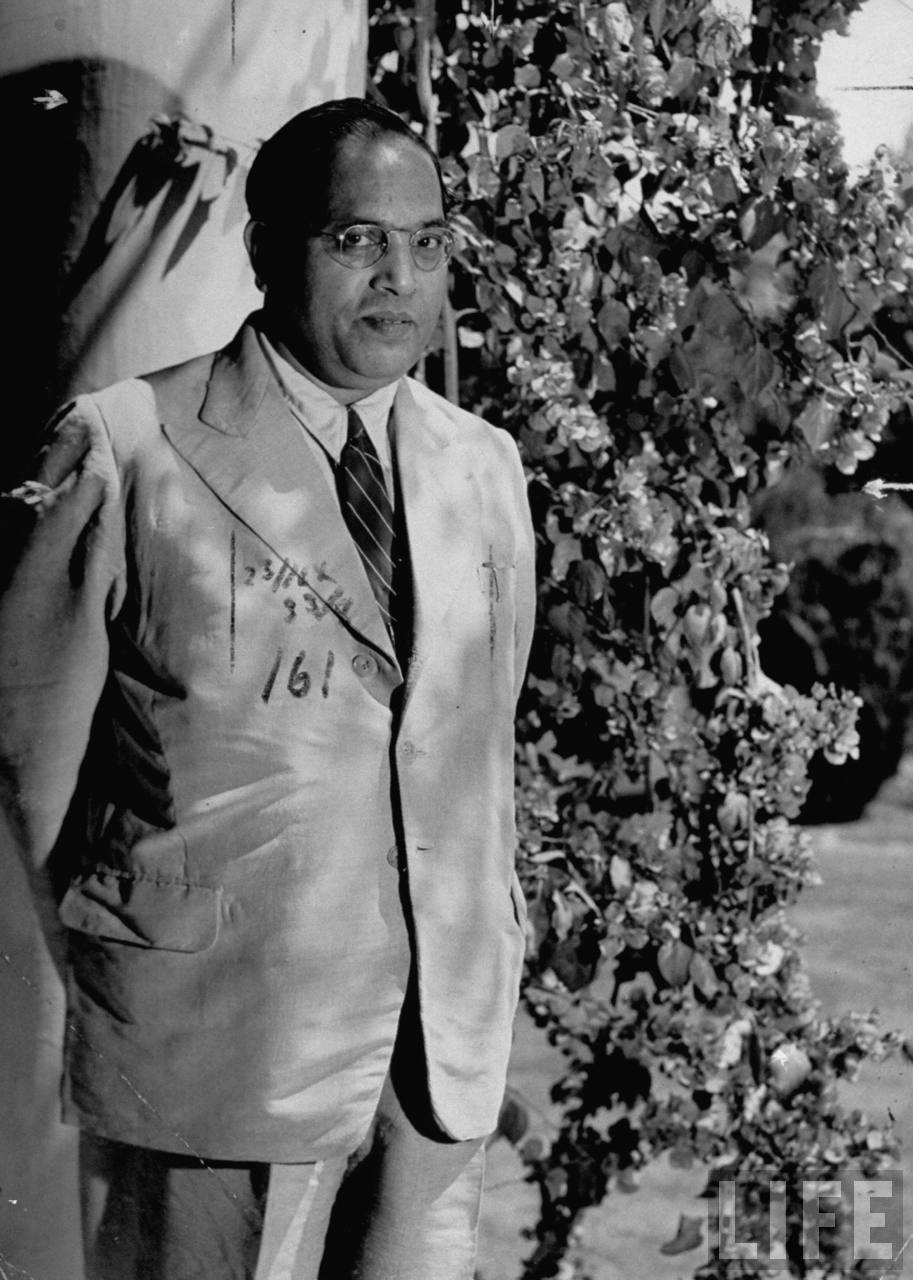
B. R. Ambedkar

The following things have been named after B. R. Ambedkar, an Indian jurist, economist, politician and Social reformer, who inspired the Dalit Buddhist movement and campaigned against social discrimination towards the untouchables (Dalits), by giving them gift of Buddhism for their upliftment and social progress.

== Airports ==
- Dr. Babasaheb Ambedkar International Airport – Nagpur, Maharashtra
- Dr. Bhimrao Ambedkar Airstrip – Meerut, Uttar Pradesh

== Awards and Prizes ==
=== By the Government of India ===
- Dr. Ambedkar International Award
- Dr. Ambedkar National Award

=== By the Government of Maharashtra ===
- Shahu, Phule, Ambedkar Award
- Dr. Babasaheb Ambedkar Samaj Utthan Award

== Places ==
=== District ===
- Ambedkar Nagar district, Uttar Pradesh
- Dr. B.R. Ambedkar Konaseema district, Andhra Pradesh

=== Sub-District ===
- Dr. Ambedkar Nagar Mhow - Indore, Madhya Pradesh

=== Village ===
- Ambedkar Nagar, Jodhpur - village in Rajasthan
- Dr. B. R. Ambedkar balanagar, Hyderabad - village in Telangana

=== Constituency ===
- Ambedkar Nagar Assembly constituency - Dehli
- Ambedkar Nagar Lok Sabha constituency - Uttar Pradesh

== Holidays & Celebrations ==
- Ambedkar Jayanti
- Students' Day (Maharashtra)
- Mahaparinirvan Diwas
- Dhammachakra Pravartan Din

== Hospitals ==
- Tripura Medical College & Dr. B.R. Ambedkar Memorial Teaching Hospital
- Ambedkar Nagar Hospital, Delhi
- Dr.Babasaheb Ambedkar Memorial Hospital Raipur, Chhattisgarh
- Dr Babasaheb Ambedkar Medical College And Hospital Rohini, Delhi
- Bharatratna Dr Babasaheb Ambedkar District General Hospital, Amravati
- Dr. Ambedkar Hospital And Research Center, Nagpur
- Dr. Babasaheb Ambedkar Memorial Central Railway Hospital Byculla Mumbai
- Dr Babasaheb Ambedkar Ganshatabdi Hospital Kandivali, Mumbai
- Dr.B.R.Ambedkar Medical College And Hospital Bengaluru
- Dr.Bhimrao Ambedkar Multispeciality Hospital Govt.hospital in Noida,(Uttar Pradesh)

== Memorials, museums, parks, and buildings ==
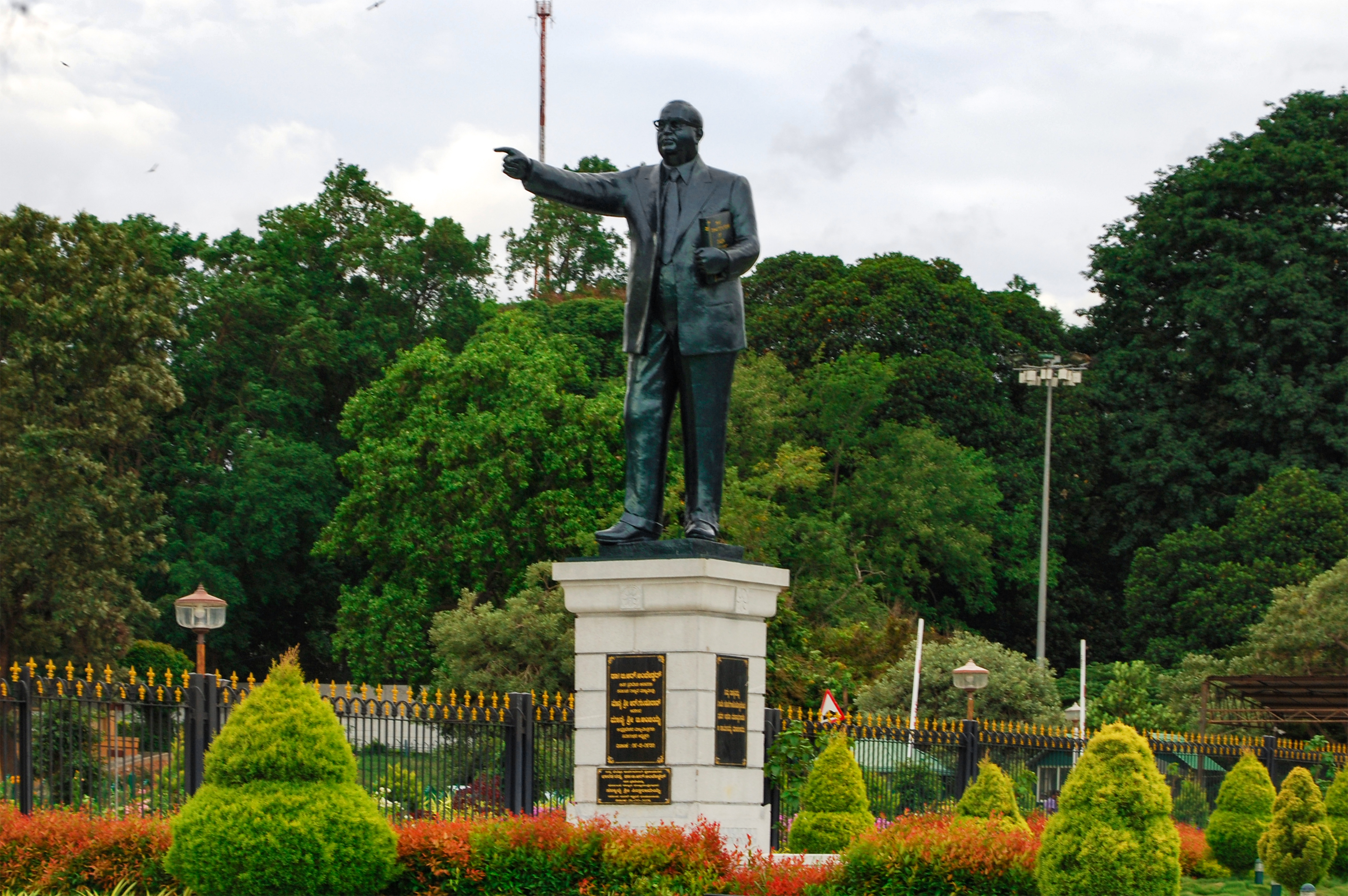
Statue of B. R. Ambedkar, Vidhana Soudha, Bengaluru

=== Andhra Pradesh ===
- Statue of Social Justice, or Dr. B. R. Ambedkar Memorial Park

=== Delhi ===
- Statue of B. R. Ambedkar ― Parliament House, New Delhi
- Dr. Ambedkar National Memorial — 26 Alipur Road, New Delhi
- Statue of B. R. Ambedkar- Supreme Court of India

=== Madhya Pradesh ===
- Bhim Janmabhoomi — Birthplace of B. R. Ambedkar, Mhow, Madhya Pradesh
- Dr. Bhimrao Ambedkar Wildlife Sanctuary-wildlife sanctuary in Sagar district

=== Maharashtra ===
==== Holy Places ====
- Parampujya Dr. Babasaheb Ambedkar Mahaparinirvan Memorial, Chaitya Bhoomi — Mumbai, Maharashtra
- Deekshabhoomi-Nagpur, Maharashtra
- Rajgruha - Dadar, Mumbai, Maharashtra; Ambedkar's house

==== Gardens ====
- Dr Babasaheb Ambedkar Garden, Powai

==== Statues ====
- Statue of Equality Mumbai, Maharashtra
- Dr Babasaheb Ambedkar Statue Vidhan Bhavan Mumbai
- Dr Babasaheb Ambedkar statue Mantralaya Road Mumbai
- Dr Babasaheb Ambedkar Statue Bandra, Mumbai
- Dr Babasaheb Ambedkar Statue Ramabai Nagar, Ghatkopar Mumbai
- Dr Babasaheb Ambedkar Statue Court Naka, Thane
- Dr Babasaheb Ambedkar Statue Thana Station
- Dr Babasaheb Ambedkar Statue kopri Thane
- Dr Babasaheb Ambedkar Statue Mira-Bhayandar
- Dr Babasaheb Ambedkar Statue Badlapur
- Dr Babasaheb Ambedkar Statue Panvel
- Dr Babasaheb Ambedkar Statue Karjat
- Dr Babasaheb Ambedkar Statue Lonavala
- Dr Babasaheb Ambedkar Statue Kalyan Court
- Dr Babasaheb Ambedkar Statue Kalyan Smark
- Dr Babasaheb Ambedkar Statue Ulhasnagar
- Dr Babasaheb Ambedkar Statue Pune Junction railway station
- Dr Babasaheb Ambedkar Statue Pune Camp
- Dr Babasaheb Ambedkar Statue Dapodi Pune
- Dr Babasaheb Ambedkar Statue Khadki Pune
- Dr Babasaheb Ambedkar Statue Pimpri-Chinchwad
- Dr Babasaheb Ambedkar Statue University rd Pune
- Dr Babasaheb Ambedkar Statue Shalimar Nashik
- Dr Babasaheb Ambedkar Statue Deolali Nashik
- Dr Babasaheb Ambedkar Statue Jalgaon Railway station
- Dr Babasaheb Ambedkar Statue Bhadkal Gate Aurangabad
- Dr Babasaheb Ambedkar Statue Latur City Municipal Corporation
- Dr Babasaheb Ambedkar Statue Udgir Latur
- Dr Babasaheb Ambedkar Statue Nilanga Latur
- Dr Babasaheb Ambedkar Statue Nagpur
- Dr Babasaheb Ambedkar Statue Manmad
- Dr Babasaheb Ambedkar Statue Vaijapur
- Dr Babasaheb Ambedkar Statue Lasalgaon
- Dr Babasaheb Ambedkar Statue Baramati
- Dr Babasaheb Ambedkar Statue Karad
- Dr Babasaheb Ambedkar Statue Sangli
- Dr Babasaheb Ambedkar 1st Statue Kolhapur
- Dr Babasaheb Ambedkar Statue Satara
- Dr Babasaheb Ambedkar Statue Pandharpur
- Dr Babasaheb Ambedkar Statue Solapur
- Dr Babasaheb Ambedkar Statue Dharashiv
- Dr Babasaheb Ambedkar Statue Dhule
- Dr Babasaheb Ambedkar Statue Beed
- Dr Babasaheb Ambedkar Statue Parbhani
- Dr Babasaheb Ambedkar Statue Jintur
- Dr Babasaheb Ambedkar Statue Nanded
- Dr Babasaheb Ambedkar Statue Akola
- Dr Babasaheb Ambedkar Statue Amravati
- Dr Babasaheb Ambedkar Statue Yavatmal
- Dr Babasaheb Ambedkar Statue Chandrapur
- Dr Babasaheb Ambedkar Statue Charmoshi
- Dr Babasaheb Ambedkar Statue Rameshwari, Nagpur
- Dr Babasaheb Ambedkar Statue Pratap Nagar, Nagpur
- Dr Babasaheb Ambedkar Statue RBI Square, Nagpur
- Dr Babasaheb Ambedkar Statue Jaripatka, Nagpur
- Dr Babasaheb Ambedkar Statue Dixt Nagar, Nagpur
- Dr Babasaheb Ambedkar Statue Kampti Nagpur
- Dr Babasaheb Ambedkar Statue Mahad
- Dr Babasaheb Ambedkar Statue Yeola
- Dr Babasaheb Ambedkar Statue Alibaug
- Dr Babasaheb Ambedkar Statue Manmad
- Dr Babasaheb Ambedkar Statue Bhandara
- Dr Babasaheb Ambedkar Statue Hingoli
- Dr Babasaheb Ambedkar Statue Nandurbar
- Dr Babasaheb Ambedkar Statue Tarhadi, Shirpur, Dhule.

=== Telangana ===
- Dr. B. R. Ambedkar Balanagar metro station in Hyderabad.
- Dr. B. R. Ambedkar Telangana Secretariat in Hyderabad.
- Dr Babasaheb Ambedkar 125ft Statue Tank Bund Hyderabad

=== Tamil Nadu ===
- Dr. Ambedkar Mani Mandapam — Chennai
- Tamil Nadu Dr. Ambedkar Law University, Chennai

=== Uttar Pradesh ===
- Ambedkar Memorial Park — Lucknow, Uttar Pradesh

=== In other countries ===
- Statue of Bhimrao Ambedkar - Koyasan University, Japan
- Columbia University, New York, USA
- London School of Economics, London, UK
- Wolverhampton Buddha Vihar, UK
- Simon Fraser University, Burnaby, Canada
- Ambedkar Memorial, Maryland, United States
- Ambedkar House, London, United Kingdom
- Ambedkar statue in Indian Embassy, Baku, Azerbaijan
- Ambedkar Statue in Moka University, Mauritius
- Ambedkar Statue Melbourne University, Australia
- Ambedkar statue in Chùa Quan Âm Đông Hải monastery, Vietnam
- Ambedkar statue in Rai Chern Tawan Meditation Center, Thailand
- Ambedkar statue in South Korea
- Ambedkar statue in School Miskolc, Hungary
- Ambedkar statue in NIROX Sculpture Park, South Africa

== Films ==
Many films have been made on Ambedkar's life and thoughts, which are as follows:

- Bheem Garjana - 1990 Marathi film directed by Vijay Pawar, starring Krishnanand as Ambedkar.
- Balak Ambedkar - 1991 Kannada film directed by Basavaraj Kethur, starring Chiranjeevi Vinay as Ambedkar.
- Yugpurush Dr. Babasaheb Ambedkar - 1993 Marathi film directed by Shashikant Nalawde, starring Narayan Dulke as Ambedkar.
- Dr. Babasaheb Ambedkar (film) - 2000 English film directed by Jabbar Patel, starring Mammootty as Ambedkar.
- Dr. B. R. Ambedkar (film) - 2005 Kannada film directed by Sharan Kumar Kabbur, starring Vishnukanta B. Ambedkar.
- Teesri Azaadi – A 2006 Hindi film directed by Jabbar Patel.
- Rising Light - 2006 documentary film on Ambedkar.
- Ramabai Bhimrao Ambedkar (film) - 2011 Marathi film based on the life of Ramabai Ambedkar and directed by Prakash Jadhav, starring Ganesh Jethe as Bhimrao Ambedkar.
- A Journey of Samyak Buddha - Hindi film (2013), based on Ambedkar's book The Buddha and His Dhamma.
- Ramabai - 2016 Kannada film directed by M Ranganath, starring Siddaram Karnik as Bhimrao Ambedkar.
- Bole India Jai Bhim – 2016 Marathi film directed by Subodh Nagdeve, starring Shyam Bhimsariyan as Ambedkar.
- Sharanam Gachhami – 2017 Telugu film directed by Prem Raj, based on the thoughts of Ambedkar. The film also has a song titled 'Ambedkar Sharanam Gachhami', in which Ambedkar is also featured.
- Bal Bhimrao – 2018 Marathi film directed by Prakash Narayan, starring Manish Kamble as Ambedkar.
- Ramai – An upcoming Marathi film directed by Bal Bargale.
- Periyar - 2007 Tamil film based on the life of Periyar and directed by Gnana Rajasekaran, starring Mohan Ran as Dr. Babasaheb Ambedkar.
- Ek Mahanayak - Dr. B.R. Ambedkar - 2019–2020
- Dr. Babasaheb Ambedkar – Mahamanvachi Gauravgatha – 2019

== Stadiums ==
- Bharat Ratna Dr. Babasaheb Ambedkar Stadium — Baramati, Maharashtra
- Ambedkar Stadium New Delhi
- Dr Bhimrao Ambedkar Stadium — Karnataka
- Dr Bhimrao Ambedkar International Sports Stadium — Ayodhya, Uttar Pradesh
- Dr. Ambedkar Stadium Kochi, Kerala
- Dr. Ambedkar Stadium Mukarampura, Karimnagar, Telangana
- Dr. Ambedkar Stadium Basaveshwaranagara

== Political parties and organisations ==
- Ambedkar International Center
- Ambedkar Makkal Iyakkam
- Ambedkar National Congress
- Ambedkar Samaj Party
- Ambedkar Students' Association
- Ambedkarite Party of India
- Bahujan Samaj Party (Ambedkar)
- Birsa Ambedkar Phule Students' Association
- Bhim Army
- Bhim Sena
- Ambedkarite Student Association (ASA) TISS

== Stations ==
- Ambedkar Nagar monorail station — Mumbai, Maharashtra
- Dr. Ambedkar Nagar railway station — Dr. Ambedkar Nagar (Mhow), Madhya Pradesh
- Dr. B. R. Ambedkar Station, Vidhana Soudha metro station — Vidhana Soudha, Bengaluru, Karnataka
- Dr. B. R. Ambedkar Balanagar metro station - Hyderabad, Telangana

== Universities ==
- Dr. B. R. Ambedkar University Delhi – Delhi
- Babasaheb Bhimrao Ambedkar Bihar University – Muzaffarpur, Bihar
- Babasaheb Bhimrao Ambedkar University – Lucknow, Uttar Pradesh
- Dr. B. R. Ambedkar National Law University – Sonipat, Haryana
- Dr. B.R. Ambedkar Open University – Hyderabad, Telangana
- Dr. B. R. Ambedkar University, Srikakulam – Etcherla, Andhra Pradesh
- Dr. B. R. Ambedkar University of Social Sciences – Dr. Ambedkar Nagar (Mhow), Madhya Pradesh
- Dr. Babasaheb Ambedkar Marathwada University – Aurangabad, Maharashtra
- Dr. Babasaheb Ambedkar Open University – Ahmedabad, Gujarat
- Dr. Babasaheb Ambedkar Technological University – Lonere, Maharashtra
- Dr. Bhimrao Ambedkar Law University – Jaipur, Rajasthan
- Dr. Bhimrao Ambedkar University – Agra, Uttar Pradesh
- Tamil Nadu Dr. Ambedkar Law University – Chennai, Tamil Nadu
- Dr. B. R. Ambedkar School of Economics University - Bengaluru, Karnataka
- Baba Saheb Ambedkar Education University - Kolkata, West Bengal

== Schools, colleges and research institutes ==
=== Andaman and Nicobar Islands ===
- Dr. B. R. Ambedkar Institute of Technology — Port Blair

=== Delhi ===
- Dr. Bhim Rao Ambedkar College - Delhi

=== Karnataka ===
- Dr. Ambedkar Institute of Technology — Nagarbhavi, Bengaluru
- Dr. Ambedkar Medical College — Bengaluru

=== Maharashtra ===
- Dr. Ambedkar College, Nagpur
- Dr. Babasaheb Ambedkar College of Arts, Commerce and Science, Chandrapur
- Dr. Ambedkar College of Commerce & Economics, Wadala, Mumbai
- Dr. Babasaheb Ambedkar arts and commerce college, Aurangabad
- Dr. Babasaheb Ambedkar College of Law, Nagpur

=== Punjab ===
- Dr. B. R. Ambedkar National Institute of Technology Jalandhar — Jalandhar
- Dr. B.R. Ambedkar State Institute of Medical Sciences, Mohali

=== Tamil Nadu ===
- Dr. Ambedkar Government Law College, Chennai
- Dr. Ambedkar Government Arts College, Vyasarpadi, Chennai

=== Uttar Pradesh ===
- Dr Bhimrao Ambedkar Bird Wildlife Sanctuary, Pratapgarh district, Uttar Pradesh

=== West Bengal ===
- Dr. B. R. Ambedkar Satabarshiki Mahavidyalaya — Helencha, Bagdah
- Dr. B.R. Ambedkar College — Betai, Nadia district
- Kultali Dr. B. R. Ambedkar College — Kultali, South 24 Parganas

=== Rajasthan ===
- Dr.Ambedkar Pg College Jaipur, Rajasthan

== Vandalism of Ambedkar statues ==
People often protest vandalism of Ambedkar statues, with the 2006 Dalit protests in Maharashtra being a notable instance. Another such protest led to the 1997 Ramabai killings.

== See also ==
- Ambedkarism
- Ambedkar cartoon
