= Jai Bhim (disambiguation) =

Jai Bhim (transl. "Victory to Bhim) is a slogan that refers to B. R. Ambedkar.

Jai Bhim may also refer to:

- Jai Bhim (film)
  - Jai Bhim (soundtrack)
- Jai Bhim Comrade, a film

== See also ==
- Ambedkar (disambiguation)
