= Dr. B. R. Ambedkar University =

Dr. B. R. Ambedkar University (or Dr. Bhimrao Ambedkar University, Dr. Babasaheb Ambedkar University, Babasaheb Bhimrao Ambedkar University and Dr. Ambedkar University) may refer to one of several universities in India named after B. R. Ambedkar:

- Dr. Bhimrao Ambedkar University, Agra, Uttar Pradesh, India
- Dr. B. R. Ambedkar University Delhi
- Dr. B. R. Ambedkar University, Srikakulam, Andhra Pradesh, India
- Dr. B. R. Ambedkar University of Social Sciences, Madhya Pradesh
- Dr. B. R. Ambedkar National Law University, Sonipat, Haryana, India
- Dr. B. R. Ambedkar School of Economics University, Karnataka, India
- Dr. Babasaheb Ambedkar Marathwada University, Aurangabad, Maharashtra, India
- Dr. Babasaheb Ambedkar Open University
- Dr. Babasaheb Ambedkar Technological University, Maharashtra, India
- Baba Saheb Ambedkar Education University, West Bengal, India
- Babasaheb Bhimrao Ambedkar University, Lucknow, Uttar Pradesh, India
- Babasaheb Bhimrao Ambedkar Bihar University, Bihar, India
- Tamil Nadu Dr. Ambedkar Law University, Chennai, Tamil Nadu, India

== See also ==
- Ambedkar (disambiguation)
- List of things named after B. R. Ambedkar
