= 1997 Ramabai killings =

Mass killings of Dalits in Mumbai, India

Coordinates: 19°04′26.9″N 72°55′10.6″E

- Part of Caste-related violence in India
- Date: 11 July 1997
- Location: Ramabai colony, Mumbai
- Methods: Police violence

Parties
Special Reserve Police Force (SRPF)	Dalit protesters

Lead figures
Manohar Kadam (SRPF sub-Inspector)	

Casualties and losses
	10 killed, 26 injured
- Location within Mumbai Location within Maharashtra

The 1997 Ramabai killings were a mass killing of Dalit residents of the Ramabai Ambedkar Nagar colony in Mumbai on 11 July 1997. A team of State Reserve Police Force members fired upon a crowd protesting the recent desecration of a statue of Constitution maker B. R. Ambedkar. 10 Dalits were killed and 26 injured in the incident.

The statue of Ambedkar was defaced with a garland of shoes which angered the Dalits. The Dalits took to the street and the police opened fire killing 10 Dalits. Police officer Manohar Kadam, who allegedly ordered the firing, was released on bail in 2009.

== Attacks ==
Ramabai Ambedkar Nagar is a predominantly Dalit urban colony in the city of Mumbai. On 11 July 1997, a statue of Ambedkar in front of the colony was found to have had a garland of sandals placed around its neck, in an act widely seen as a desecration. The outraged residents of the colony complained to the nearest police station, Local Beat No. 5 Pantnagar Police, which happened to be located a few metres from the statue. The complainants were instead directed to the Pantnagar police station. A crowd of protesters began to form, and by 7 AM had blocked the highway that ran in front of the colony.

A team of State Reserve Police Force (SRPF) members arrived a few minutes later, and opened fire on the crowd with live ammunition. The firing continued for 10–15 minutes, and killed 10 people, including a bystander who had not been involved in the protests. The protests then grew more violent. At approximately 11:30 AM, a luxury bus was set ablaze. In response, about 25 police officers entered Ramabai Colony, deployed tear gas and began a lathi charge. By the end of the day 26 people had been seriously injured, and Local Beat No. 5 had been destroyed by the protesters.

Commentators on the event suggested that the excessive use of force was motivated by caste-based prejudice against the Dalit protesters. This was because the sub-Inspector who led the police force stood accused in multiple cases involving caste-based discrimination. Vilas Ghogre, a Dalit activist, poet, and artist, committed suicide in protest at the event.

== Trial ==
Following the killing, the Maharashtra Government appointed the Gundewar commission to enquire into the issue in November 1997. In 1999, the commission published its report. Two years later a case was filed in a sessions court against Manohar Kadam. A few years later, it was transferred to the Crime Investigation Department, which filed a charge-sheet in 2006. In 2009, the sessions court found Kadam guilty of "homicide amounting to murder," and sentenced him to life-imprisonment. However, the sentence was later revoked by the high-court, and released him on bail. In April 2011, the protesters who had been arrested for setting the bus on fire were acquitted, with the court finding that they had not been present during the incident.

== In media ==
Indian documentary film-maker Anand Patwardhan, a friend of Vilas Ghogre, created a documentary based on the incident, entitled Jai Bhim Comrade. Patwardhan stated that the filming took 14 years because he was waiting for the accused policemen to be jailed, and the residents of the colony to be acquitted.

== See also ==
- Vandalism of Ambedkar statues
- 2006 Dalit protests in Maharashtra; a set of protests also in response to the desecration of a statue of Ambedkar.
- Caste-related violence in India
