= Kabir Kala Manch =

Indian cultural organization

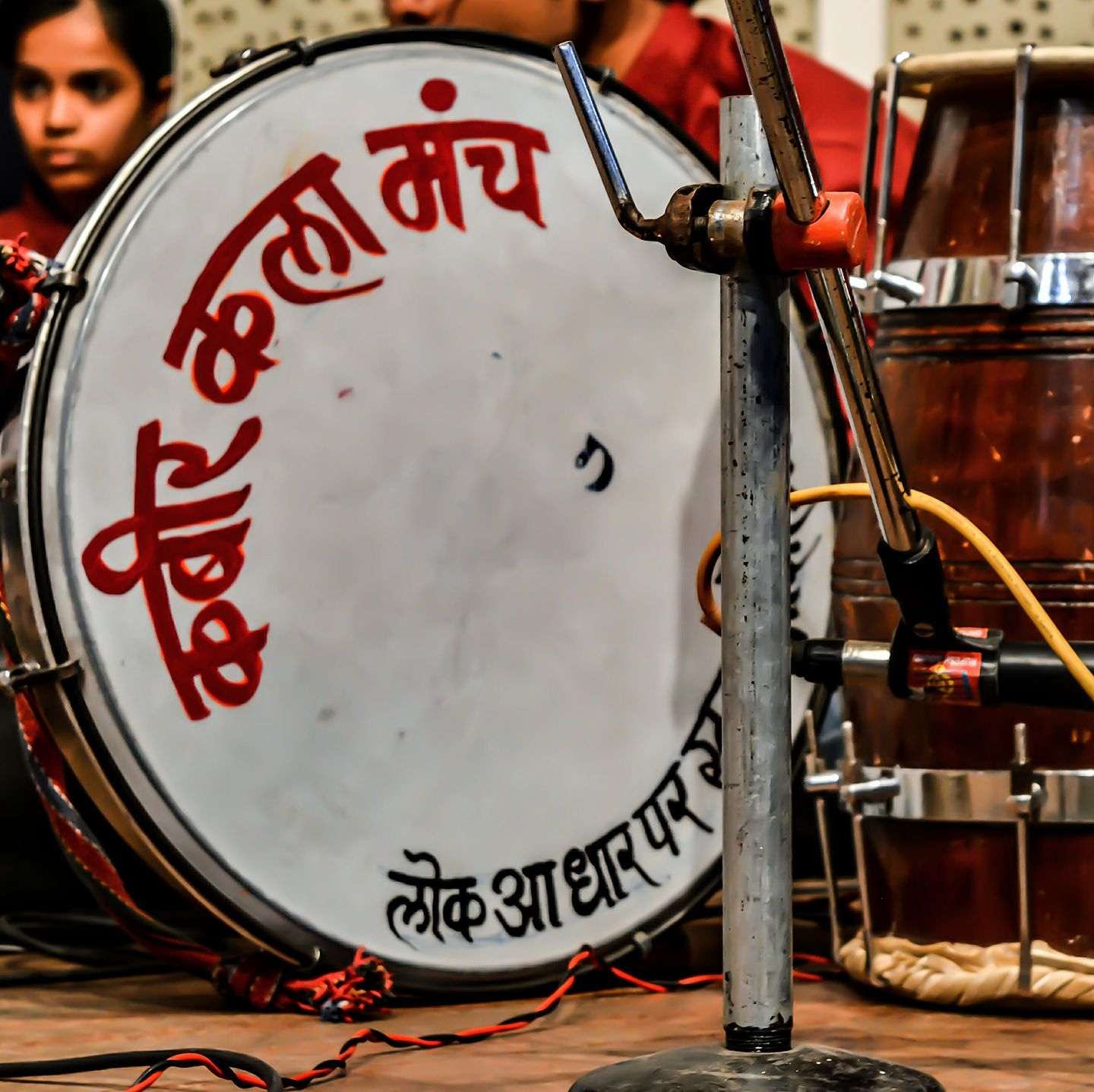
- Abbreviation: KKM
- Formation: 2002
- Type: Cultural organisation
- Headquarters: Pune, Maharashtra, India
- Location: Pune
- Region served: Maharashtra
- Official language: Marathi, Hindi

Kabir Kala Manch was a cultural organisation that was formed in Pune, Maharashtra, India, in the wake of the Gujarat riots in 2002. Through music, poetry and theatre, it aims to spread an anti-caste, pro-democracy message. It comprises students and young professionals who perform protest poetry and plays in slums and streets.

== History ==
After the Gujarat riots of 2002, a group of students came together and formed Kabir Kala Manch, a cultural group which, through their music and poetry, took up the cause of social inequality, exploitation of the underclasses, farmer suicides, female infanticide, Dalit killings and the widening net of corruption.

Some of the performances of the Kabir Kala Manch have been featured by Anand Patwardhan in his documentary Jai Bhim Comrade.

== Allegations of Naxalite links ==
Kabir Kala Manch activists were arrested under the Unlawful Activities (Prevention) Act as being "Maoists" and "Naxalites" by the Government of Maharashtra. In May 2011, a crackdown by the Anti-Terrorism Squad on musicians and poets accused of promoting Maoist or Naxalite ideology led to Sheetal Sathe and other members of Kabir Kala Manch going into hiding.

On 2 April 2013, Sheetal Sathe and her husband Sachin Male, also a member of KKM, came out of hiding from the police in Mumbai while maintaining that they were innocent of the charges and insisting their act did not constitute "surrender", after two members of KKM, Deepak Dengle and Siddharth, were granted bail by the Bombay High Court. But in spite of her pregnancy, Sheetal, along with her husband, were denied bail immediately and again on 4 June 2013 by the Mumbai Sessions Court. She was finally granted bail by the Bombay High Court on 28 June 2013 on humanitarian grounds. On 3 January 2017, the remaining arrested members of the group — Sachin Mali, Sagar Gorkhe and Ramesh Ghaichor — were granted bail by the Supreme Court of India.

In December 2020, two KKM members Sagar Gorkhe and Ramesh Gaichor, challenged their arrest in the Bombay High Court. The National Investigation Agency stated in court that the reason they had been arrested was that they had sung songs in which they criticized Prime Minister Narendra Modi and several government policies of the Bharatiya Janata Party. The NIA produced translations of these songs in court, which, amongst other things, encouraged people to drink cow urine (a practice promoted by the AYUSH Ministry in India), mocked the Prime Minister's radio lecture, "Mann ki Baat" and warned those who criticized Prime Minister Modi that doing so was dangerous because as a consequence, " elimination is certain." The NIA produced these translations as proof of violent activities and conspiracies.

== Attack on KKM members ==
KKM members along with the event's organisers, were attacked by the members of Akhil Bhartiya Vidyarthi Parishad after their performance at National Film Archive of India (NFAI), organized by the students of Film and Television Institute of India, Pune.
