= Ambedkar (disambiguation) =

B. R. Ambedkar (1891–1956) was an Indian politician and social reformer.

Ambedkar may also refer to:

== People with the surname ==
- Ambedkar family, the family of B. R. Ambedkar
- Anandraj Ambedkar (born 1967), Indian politician
- Bhimrao Ambedkar (Uttar Pradesh politician) (fl. from 2007), Indian politician
- Prakash Yashwant Ambedkar (born 1954), known as Balasaheb Ambedkar, Indian politician and lawyer
- Ramabai Bhimrao Ambedkar (1896/1897–1935), wife of B. R. Ambedkar
- Savita Ambedkar (1909–2003), Indian activist, second wife of B. R. Ambedkar
- Yashwant Ambedkar (1912–1977), also known as Bhaiyasaheb Ambedkar, Indian politician and son of B. R. Ambedkar

== Other uses ==
- List of things named after B. R. Ambedkar

== See also ==
- Babasaheb (title)
- Bhim (disambiguation)
- Bhimrao, an Indian male given name
