= Sheetal Sathe =

Sheetal Sathe is a folk singer, poet, and Dalit rights activist from Pune, Maharashtra, who rose to prominence within as one of the lead singers of Kabir Kala Manch in the mid-2000s.

From 2007, documentary filmmaker Anand Patwardhan filmed Kabir Kala Manch performances and interviewed Sathe extensively while gathering footage for Jai Bhim Comrade, a film about caste tensions and violence stemming from the police killings at Ramabai Nagar, Mumbai in 1997. Jai Bhim Comrade was finally released in 2011, according to Patwardhan, "so that people like Sheetal can come out in the open again and prove that they hadn't done anything wrong, anything more than speak up for the powerless”. The film, which was screened in colleges and universities around India, introduced Sathe's music and message to an audience outside Maharashtra.

== Works ==
- Bhaghat Singh Tu Zinda Hai
