= Ambedkar International Center =

American civil rights advocacy group

- Named after: Babasaheb Ambedkar
- Formation: June 2012
- Type: Nonprofit
- Purpose: "Establish intellectual, moral, and social democracy elements in every section of the Indian society, prevent and curb the plight of caste-based human rights violations to build a fairer, more egalitarian society based on the principles and philosophy of Dr. Ambedkar."
- Headquarters: Accokeek, Maryland 20607 USA
- President: Sanjay Kumar
- Vice President: Rakesh G
- Website: https://ambedkarinternationalcenter.org

Ambedkar International Center (AIC) is a civil rights advocacy group that was formed in 2012 to fight against caste discrimination in the United States. The organization's mission is to strengthen unity among scheduled castes (SCs), scheduled tribes (STs) and other backward classes (OBCs) living in the United States of America. The organisation is named after the Indian social activist and caste reformer, Bhimrao Ramji Ambedkar.

Caste is a birth based hierarchical system wherein people are divided into many endogamous groups doing hereditary occupation. As Yashica Dutta writes in the New York Times, Dalit, meaning oppressed, is a self-chosen identity for a quarter of India's population who have been at the receiving end of centuries old systematic and institutionalised discrimination and disenfranchisement.

== Context ==
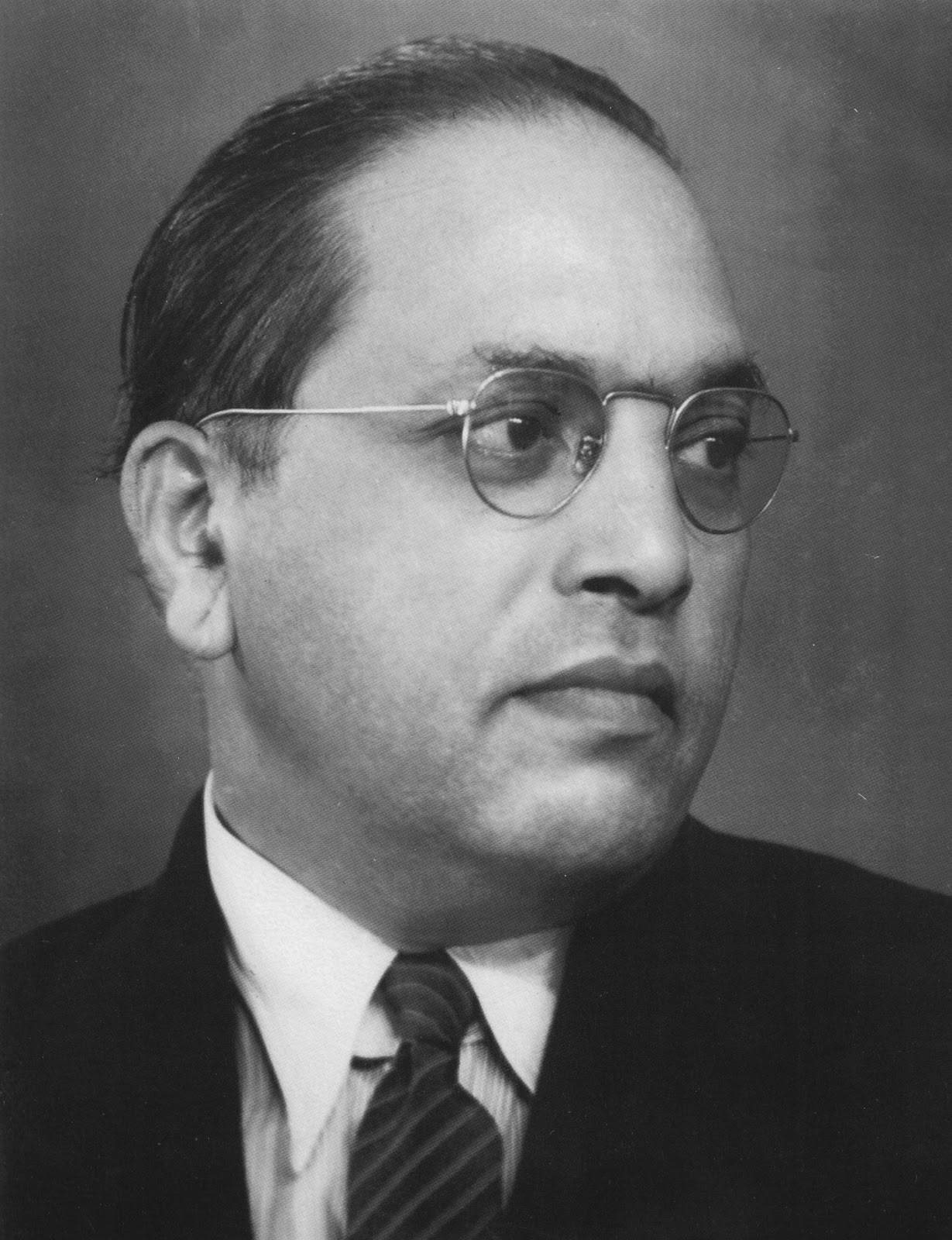
B. R. Ambedkar (1891–1956)

A person's caste is determined at birth and that channels them into that caste's occupation. Dalits, who technically do the dirtiest jobs — cleaning sewers, taking away dead animals, tanning leather and other tasks that are considered to pollute a person. In the United States as well, caste follows, as a 2018 survey by Equality Labs reveals that 67% of Dalits in the Indian diaspora within the United States admitted to facing caste-based harassment at the workplace. 25% of Dalits also reported facing verbal or physical assault based on their caste.

== Vision ==
Ambedkar International Center works for the emancipation of Dalits in the United States. In a context where a majority of Indians living in the United States are upper-caste, there are certain supremacist caste-Hindu practices such as a thread ceremony that is only for Brahmin men, promoting vegetarianism as a virtue and in effect demonizing the consumption of meat and other practices through which upper-caste Hindus establish their cultural presence as a community.

This results in a bias towards a nostalgic and celebratory view of Hinduism. Scholars such as Kancha Illiah have argued that Dalit practices do not fall within the umbrella of Hinduism, and that Hindu practices have stemmed from the oppression of Dalit communities, where and all aspects of Dalit-Bahujan social life are denied respect.

According to AIC, caste is also downplayed within these Hindu practices, as is clear from the argument a 'Hindu supremacist' organisation made in an injection in the Cisco caste discrimination case, that the State could not interfere in such matters, "effectively claiming impunity for bigotry in the name of religious freedom."

== History and organization ==
Ambedkar International Center is part of a coalition of American Ambedkarite Organizations which have been active in the anti-caste lobbying for over two decades in America. The civil-rights organization was formed in the United States in June 2012, to strengthen unity among scheduled castes, scheduled tribes and other backward classes.

In May 2013, AIC acquired the 13.2 acre property near the capital of the US, Washington DC, to establish the world's first Ambedkar International Center in the west. As per the organisation's website, the site was inaugurated by former Chief Justice of India Hon’ble K. G.Balakrishnan on 21 July 2013.

The organization is run by an executive council that is elected every two years. As of September 2021, the current executive council was elected in February 2021.

== Advocacy ==
As an American Ambedkarite organisation, Ambedkar International Center has been advocating for caste-issues that arise in the United States, and has also protested against the murder of George Floyd.

=== Cisco caste discrimination case ===
On 30 June 2020 the California Department of Fair Employment and Housing filed a lawsuit in San Jose against Cisco Systems on behalf of an employee who alleged that he had been discriminated against on the basis of his caste. On 2 March 2021 AIC approached the California Supreme Court to be admitted as an amicus curiae in the matter.

=== Sought UN's support for Bhima-Koregaon activists ===
Ambedkar International Center has been a prominent signatory amongst organisations and individuals that mounted concern over the alleged illegal detention of civil rights activists in India. The organisations allege that the evidence against Anand Teltumbede, a prominent Indian scholar, has been fabricated and urged the United Nations to engage with the Government of India to immediately withdraw all charges against Dr. Teltumbde.

=== Rohith Vemula's death ===
After Rohith Vemula, a notable dalit scholar died, AIC organised a protest in Boston, and was part of a protest in San Francisco. The Ambedkar International Center was quoted by the Deccan Chronicle, saying that "Rohith’s death was a sad day for the Dalit movement."

=== Covid relief ===
AIC-funded initiatives organised medical camps and online awareness programs in over 50 locations in remote rural and slum areas in 10 states of India. AIC also facilitated the procured of oxygen concentrators, which were shipped to Chandrapur in Maharashtra.

=== Banning caste discrimination ===
Seattle became the first city in the United States to ban caste-based discrimination, as council members voted in February 2023 to add the provision to the city's anti-bias law. The Ambedkar International Center approached the California Supreme Court to be admitted as an amicus curie in the case to provide expert and extensive information on caste discrimination. The center challenged the Hindu American Foundation's amicus brief, which argued that the caste system was not a part of Hinduism. AIC wrote in an email to Seattle City Council advocating for a "yes" vote on the ordinance.

Ram Kumar, President of the Ambedkar International Center was quoted in the Siasat Daily as saying that AIC had worked in collaboration with the Coalition of Seattle Indian-Americans, Ambedkar King Study Circle, Ambedkar Association of North America and Equality Labs to work closely with Council member Kshama Sawant to help draft this legislation.

== See also ==
- Bhim Army
- Republican Party of India
- Jai Bhim
