= Ambedkar cartoon =

2012 Indian political controversy

The Ambedkar cartoon is an issue that rocked the Parliament of India on 11 May 2012. Both the Rajya Sabha and Lok Sabha were adjourned on that day due to the ruckus created by the opposing parties. The issue was taken up by Thirumavalavan, an MP from the state of Tamil Nadu. He put the issue to parliament (Lok Sabha), but was at first denied permission to speak about it. He then showed a copy of the controversial cartoon that allegedly insulted the Chairman of the Drafting Committee of the Constitution of India, Dr. B. R. Ambedkar.

In the cartoon, the former Prime Minister of India (Congress), Jawaharlal Nehru, holds a whip and along with Ambedkar is driving a snail, which represents the Indian Constitution. The Scheduled Tribes and Scheduled Castes considered the cartoon to be insulting. The book it appeared in was published by NCERT under the guidance of the Ministry of Human Resources in 2006 under the UPA government headed by Sonia Gandhi (Indian National Congress). Later the HRD Minister Kapil Sibal apologised to the nation with regards to the cartoon. NCERT was also asked to remove the cartoon from their textbooks.

The cartoon was conceived and drawn by well-known artist K. Shankar Pillai. It was published in the textbook after getting the approval of the advisors of the textbook committee, Dr. Yogendra Yadav and Dr. Palshikar Kayasth.

== Aftermath ==
The issue created tensions across the country; a number of people raised their voices against the Congress Government, demanding the resignation of the Minister of HRD, Kapil Sibal. A group from Maharashtra went to Pune University and destroyed the office of Dr. Palshikar. Many political leaders of the country, including Ramadoss (PMK), D.Raja (CPI), Mayawati (BSP), Mulayam Singh Yadav (SP) and Sushma Swaraj (BJP) condemned the ruling UPA coalition. Dr. Satyanarayan condemned the left liberal intellectuals. Dr. Yadav and Dr. Palshikar also resigned as advisors of NCERT text book council in the wake of the controversy. A civil court also ordered a probe against Dr. Palishkar, Dr. Vasudevan and Dr. Yadav for their role in the controversy

The issue also gained widespread popularity in the Internet, where people condemned the politicians for focusing on less important issues like cartoons instead of more pertinent issues. The controversial cartoon itself was drawn in 1949, over six decades ago.

The Human Resource Minister constituted a committee (headed by Prof. Thorat, former Chairman of the University Grants Commission and belonging to Scheduled Castes) to review the matter, recommended removal of the cartoon among several others. The manner of functioning of this committee drew criticism from its members and the recommendations were only accepted partially, after a storm of criticism from academics and historians. The actions of the political leaders and of the removal of the cartoon itself was considered populist, an affront to Freedom of expression and to Ambedkar himself by other historians, as well as Dalit groups. Not only was the cartoon neither insulting to Nehru nor Ambedkar (attempting only to criticize the sluggish pace of the constitution-writing), it was thought provoking and "these over-enthusiastic members seem to have overlooked that the cartoon was employed as a pedagogic device"
