= Samata Sainik Dal =

Indian socio-political organization

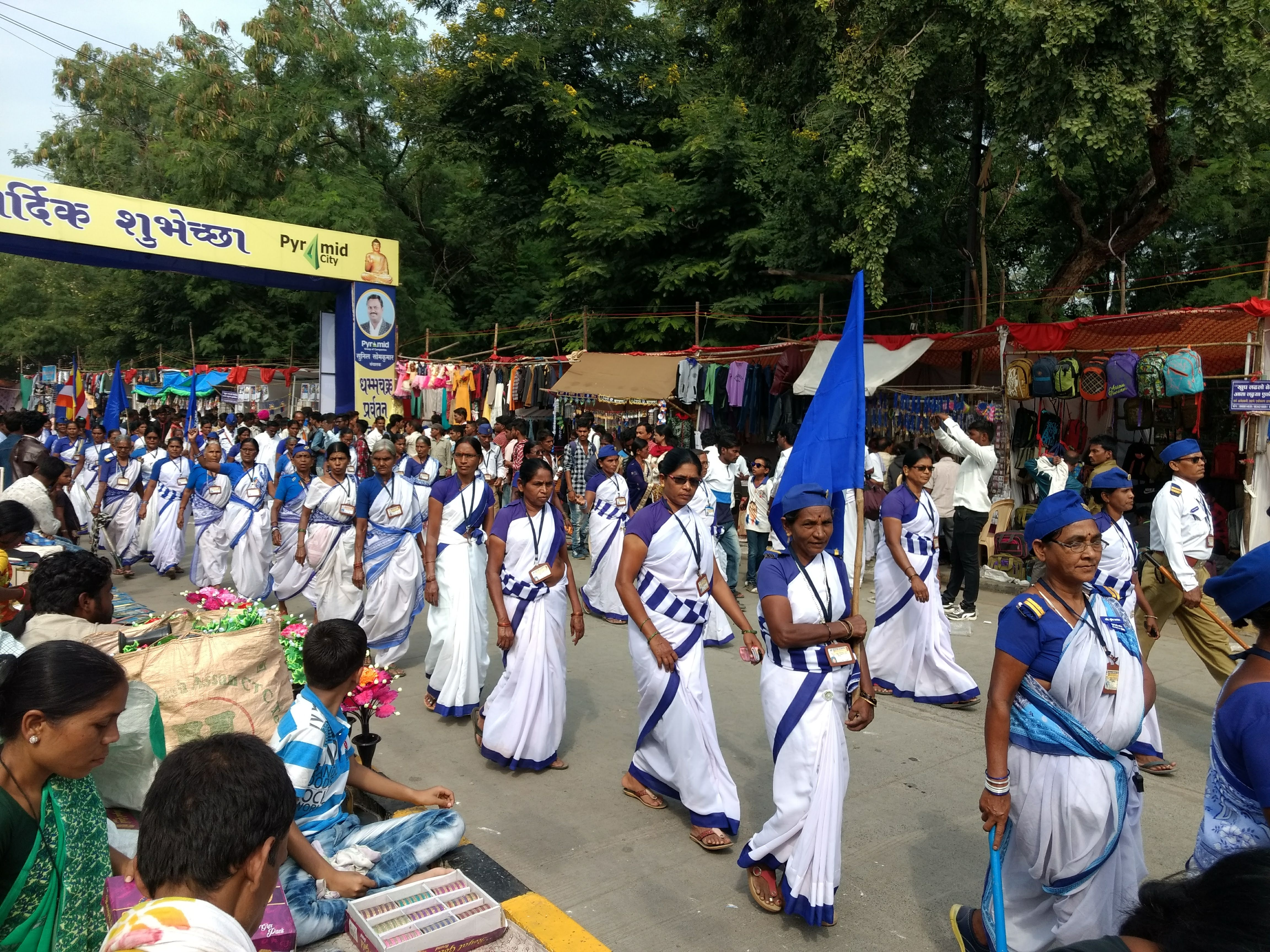
- Abbreviation: SSD
- Formation: 1927 (99 years ago)
- Founder: Bhimrao Ramji Ambedkar
- Type: Ambedkarite volunteer,
- Legal status: Active
- Purpose: Supporting Prabuddha Bharata
- Headquarters: Deekshabhoomi, Nagpur, Maharashtra, India
- Coordinates: 21°7′41″N 79°4′1″E
- Region served: India
- Official language: Hindi; 22 Languages of India
- Commander In Chief: Miratai Ambedkar
- Main organ: The Buddhist Society of India
- Affiliations: Scheduled Castes Federation
- Volunteers: Soldiers for social justice and human dignity representative of India’s Depressed class.
- Website: samatasainikdalindia.org
- Formerly called: Bhimsevak Dal

Samata Sainik Dal, (Army of Soldiers for Equality or Party of the Fighters for Equality) abbreviated as SSD, is a social organisation founded by B. R. Ambedkar in 1927 with the objective of safeguarding the rights of all oppressed sections of Indian society.

== Awards ==
- Dr. Ambedkar National Award (2012)

== Gallery ==
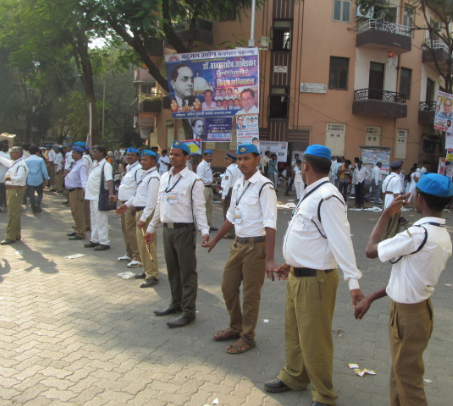
Lakhs of people around India gather at Chaitya Bhoomi to pay homage to B R Ambedkar on Mahaparinirvan Din. Volunteers take part in many activities.

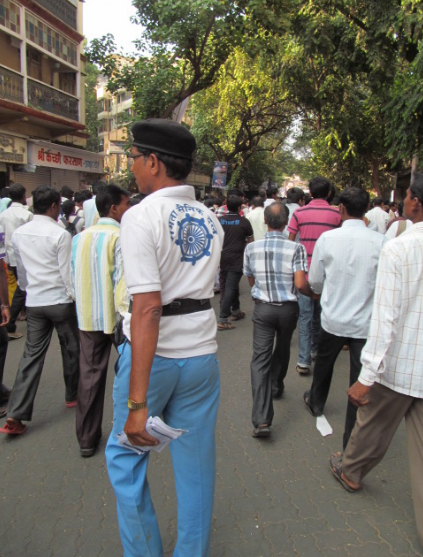
Volunteer of Samata Sainik Dal at Chaitya Bhoomi
