= Dr. Ambedkar National Award =

Indian award presented by the government of India

- National civilian award for outstanding contribution to the promotion of Social Understanding and for the upliftment of the Weaker sections in India.
- Sponsored by: Government of India
- Reward: ₹ 1 million
- First award: 1993
- Final award: 2014

Highlights
- Total awarded: 7
- First winner: National Institute of Social Work and Social Science, Bhubaneswar
- Last winner: Babu Lal Nirmal & Amar Seva Sangam
- Website: ambedkarfoundation.nic.in

The Dr. Ambedkar National Award or the Dr. Ambedkar National Award for Social Understanding and Upliftment of Weaker Sections is a national award presented by the Government of India in honour of B. R. Ambedkar, the country's first law minister, father of the Indian Constitution and champion of human rights.

== History ==
It was established in 1992 and is administered by the Dr. Ambedkar foundation to people or organizations for their outstanding work. The award symbolizes the vision of Babasaheb Ambedkar for social understanding and national integrity. The money constituent of this award is 1 million (10 Lakhs) rupees and a citation. This award is provided by the hands of the President of India.

== Recipients ==
The following people or organizations have received this award.

Year	person or organization	Place	Type
1993	National Institute of Social Work and Social Science	Bhubaneswar, Odisha	organization
1994	Rayat Shikshan Sanstha	Satara, Maharashtra	organization
1996	Ramakrishna Mission Ashram	Narainpur in Bastar district of Madhya Pradesh	organization
1998	Kasthurba Gandhi Kanya Gurukulam	Vedaraniam, Tamil Nadu	organization
2011	Sukhadeo Thorat	Maharashtra	person
2012	Samata Sainik Dal	Maharashtra	organization
2014	Babu Lal Nirmal & Amar Seva Sangam	Rajasthan; Tamil Nadu	person and organization

== See also ==
- List of awards and prizes named after B. R. Ambedkar
- Dr. B. R. Ambedkar National Award
