= Vilas Ghogre =

Indian dalit activist

Vilas Ghogre (1 June 1947 – 15 July 1997) was a prominent Dalit activist, poet, and artist from Bombay who committed suicide in protest against the 1997 Ramabai killings in which 10 Dalits were killed by Maharashtra State Reserve Police Force and 26 were injured. He is featured prominently in Anand Patwardhan's documentaries Bombay Our City (1985) Jai Bhim Comrade (2011) .
