= Bhimrao =

Bhimrao is an Indian given name. Notable persons with this name include:

- Bhimrao Ambedkar (1891–1956), Indian polymath and social reformer
- Bhimrao Badade (born 1947), Indian politician
- Bhimrao Panchale (born 1951), Marathi poet and Ghazal singer
- Bhimrao Tapkir, Indian politician
