= Ambedkar Nagar, Jodhpur =

Village in Rajasthan, India

Coordinates: 28.074°N 75.396°E

Ambedkar Nagar
- Village
- Interactive map of Ambedkar Nagar
- Location in Rajasthan, India Ambedkar Nagar (India)
- Country: India
- State: Rajasthan
- District: Jodhpur district
- Named for: Babasaheb Ambedkar

Population (2011)
  - Total: 348

Languages

Ambedkar Nagar is a village located in Phalodi Tehsil of Jodhpur district, Rajasthan, India.

As of 2011 India census the Ambedkar Nagar had a population of 348 which 180 are males while 168 are females. There's 62 house in Ambedkar Nagar. the village was named after Babasaheb Ambedkar.
