= Sukhadeo Thorat =

Indian economist

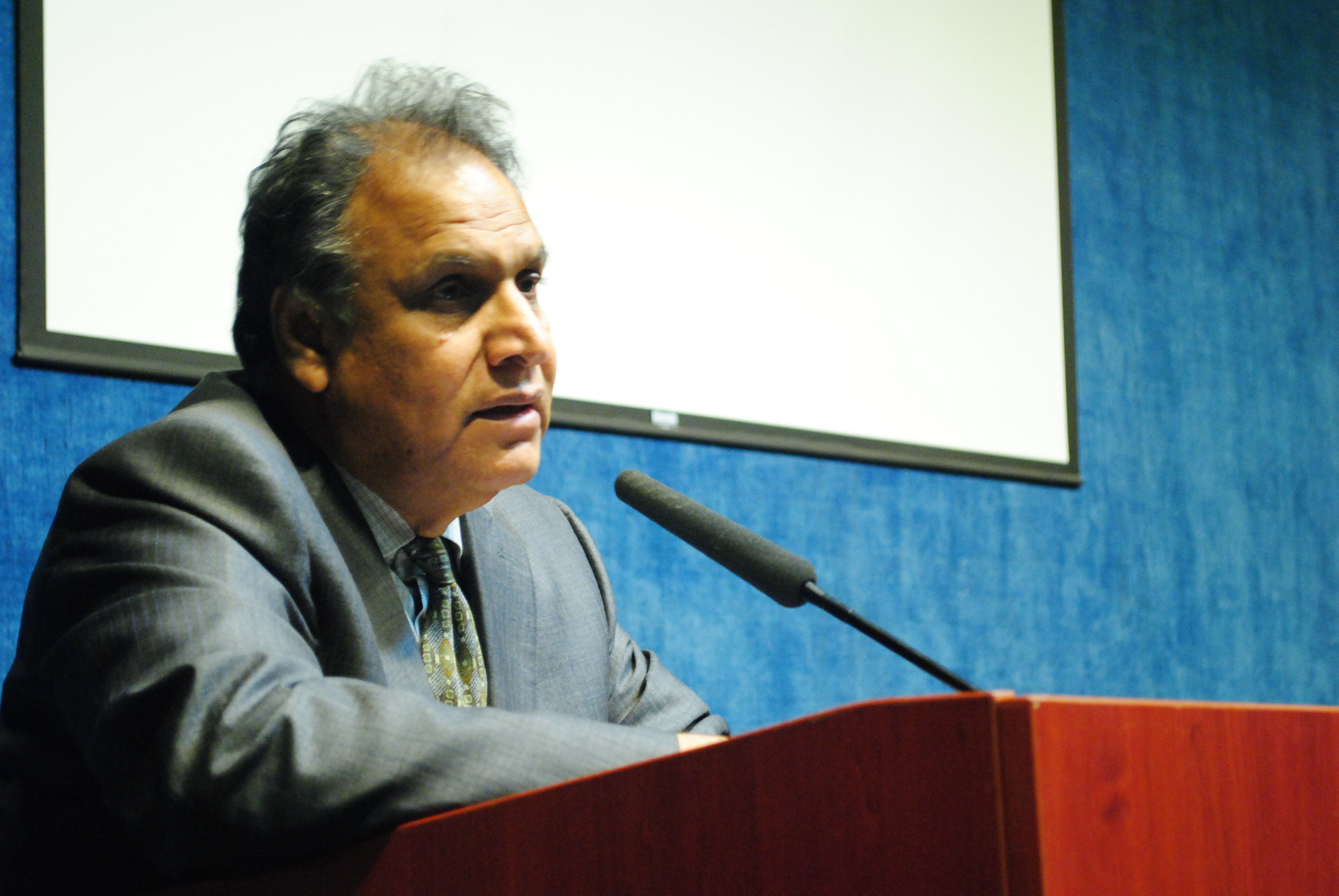
- Sukhadeo Thorat speaking at Symbiosis International University, Lavale, Pune
- Born: 12 July 1949 (age 77); Mahimapur, Amravati Maharashtra, India

Academic background
- Education: Jawaharlal Nehru University (PhD)

Academic work
- Discipline: Economics
- Institutions: University Grants Commission [Institute for Social and Economic Change]
- Awards: Padmashree (2008); Vidyalankara (2008); P.K. Patil Purushottam Award (2007); Bharat Shiromani (2006); Ambedkar Chetna (2001); Dr. Ambedkar National Award (2011); Rajiv Gandhi Outstanding Leadership National Award (2014) by the Academy of Grassroots Studies and Research of India, Tirupati, Andhra Pradesh.

Sukhadeo Thorat (born 12 July 1949) is an Indian economist, educationist, professor and writer. He is the former chairman of the University Grants Commission. He is professor emeritus in Centre for the Study of Regional Development, Jawaharlal Nehru University. He is an expert on B. R. Ambedkar.

== Education ==
Thorat hails from Buddhist community of Maharashta. Thorat graduated with a B.A. from Milind College of Arts, Aurangabad, Maharashtra. He obtained an M.A. in Economics from Dr. Babasaheb Ambedkar Marathwada University, M.Phil/PhD in Economics from Jawaharlal Nehru University, and Diploma in Economic Planning, Main School of Planning, Warsaw, Poland.

== Academic career ==
Thorat was lecturer at Vasantrao Naik Mahavidyalaya, Aurangabad from 1973 to 1980. He was Faculty Member at Jawaharlal Nehru University, New Delhi from 1980 onwards, and visiting faculty at Department of Economics, Iowa State University, Ames, USA during 1989–1991.

He has been a research associate of the International Food Policy Research Institute, Washington, DC since 1992. He was director, Indian Institute of Dalit Studies, New Delhi from January 2003 to February 2006. He served as the chairman of UGC from 2006 to 2011.

== Memberships ==
Thorat has been a member of bodies like Council for Advancement of People's Action and Rural Technology (CAPART), Social Justice Division of Planning Commission, Academic Council of Babasaheb Bhimrao Ambedkar University, Dr. Babasaheb Ambedkar Marathwada University, Centre of Buddhist Studies, University of Hyderabad, Himachal Pradesh University and in the governing bodies of many more institutions. Thorat was also chairman of Indian Council of Social Science & Research.

== Personal life ==
In 1956, due to the influence of mass conversion of Babasaheb Ambedkar, Thorat's family converted to Buddhism. Thorat is a Buddhist.

== Awards ==
- Dr. Ambedkar National Award (2011)
- Padma Shri (2008)
- Dr Ambedkar Chetna Award by Manwatawadi Rachana Manch Jallunder, Punjab
- The University of Kalyani and Avinashilingam University honoured him by conferring D.Litt in April 2007 and September 2007 respectively.
- Rajiv Gandhi Outstanding Leadership National Award for the Year 2014, conferred by the Academy of Grassroots Studies and Research of India (AGRASRI), Tirupati.

== Works ==
- Technological Change and Regional Differentiation: An Analysis of Dry Land Agriculture in Maharashtra. Khama, Delhi 1993
- Linkages between Government Spending, Growth, and Poverty in Rural India, (with Shenggen Fan, Peter Hazell), Research Report 110, International Food Policy Research Institute, Washington D.C., 1999
- Slum in Metropolies-Living Environment, (with Sudesh Nangia), June 2000, Shipra Publication, Delhi.
- Rural Development-Problem and Prospect, (edited) March 2001, Pravara Rural Development Association
- Small Hands: Child Labor in South Asia (with Kristoffel Lieten & Ravi Srivastava) Manohar, Delhi (2003)
- Development of Rural Infrastructure in India (with Simita Sirohi) Academic Delhi (2004)
- Industrialization, Economic Reforms and Regional Development: Essays in Honour of Prof Ashok K. Mathur (edited) with Jaya Prakash Pradhan & Vinoj Abraham, Shipra Publication (2004),
- Caste, Race, and Discrimination – Discourse in International Context (edited) (with Umakant), Rawat Publication, Jaipur (2004)
- Reservation and Private Sector: Quest for Equal Opportunity and Growth (edited) with Aryama and Prasant Negi (2005) Rawat Pub'lication.
- Untouchability in Rural India Sage, 2006 (with G. Shah, Harsh Mander, Satish Deshpande & Amrita).
- A Reader in Dalit Studies (edited) (with John Webster), (forthcoming) Rawat Publication.
- Dalit human development report 2006 (with Rawat), forthcoming.
- Dalits in India? Social and Economic Profile (forthcoming) Sage.
- Ambedkar's Role in Economic Planning and Water Policy, August 1998 Shipra Publication, Delhi
- Ambedkar in Retrospect: Essays in Economics, Society, and Politics (edited) with Aryama & Negi. Rawat Publication. Forthcoming
- Ambedkar on Social Exclusion and Inclusive Policy (with Narender), forthcoming.

He has also authored 70 research papers published in national and international journals. He has worked on more than 25 research projects and has presented papers at national and international seminars and conferences.
