= Students' Day (Maharashtra) =

Indian state observance (7 November)

- Observed by: Maharashtra, India
- Date: 7 November
- Next time: 7 November 2026
- Frequency: Annual

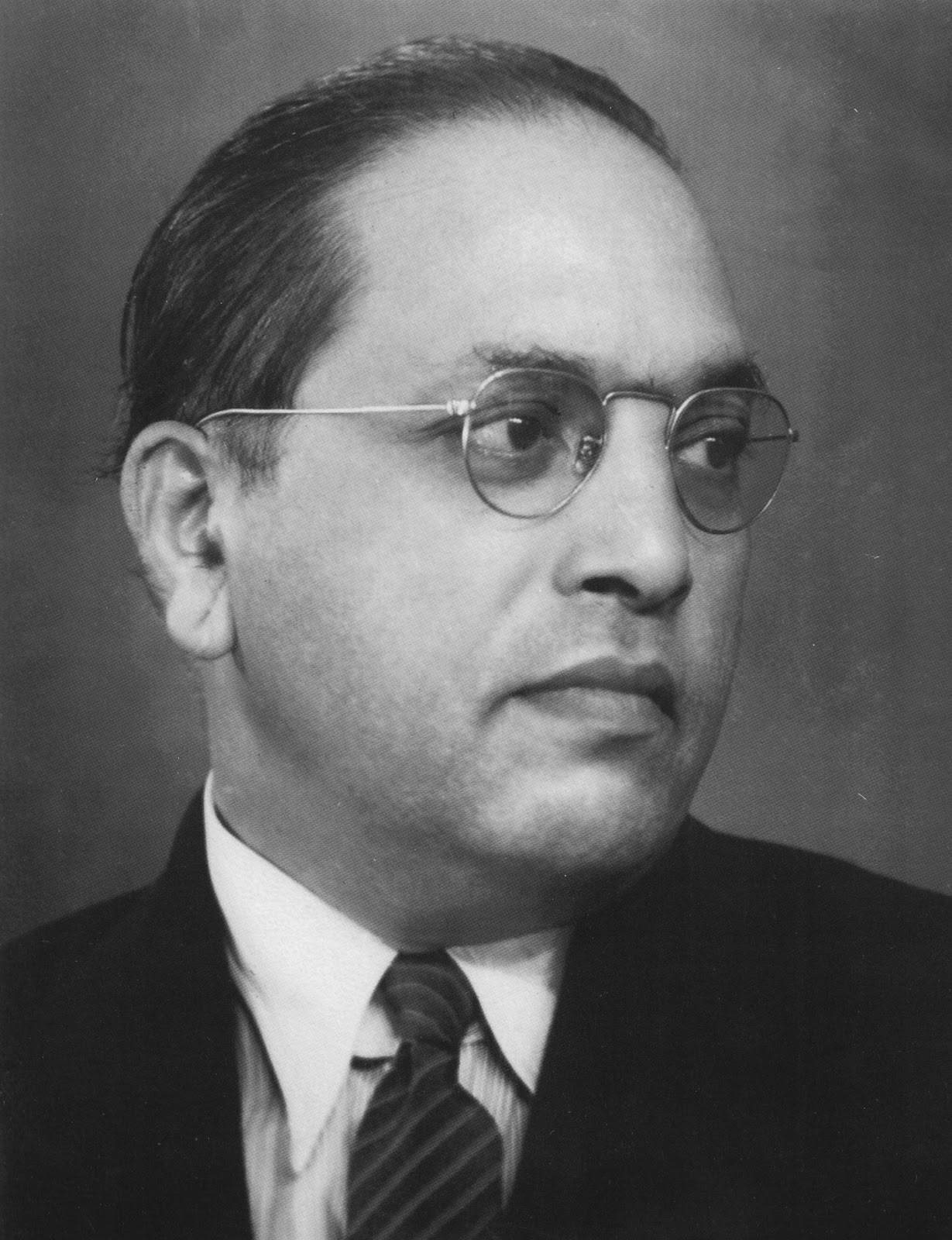
B. R. Ambedkar (1891-1956)

Students' Day or Student Day (Marathi: विद्यार्थी दिन, Vidyārthī dina) is marked on Babasaheb Ambedkar's school entry day, 7 November. On 27 November 2017, the government of Maharashtra declared 7 November "Students' Day".

Students' Day is celebrated all over Maharashtra on 7 November in honor of B. R. Ambedkar. The Education Department of the Government of Maharashtra decided to celebrate 7 November as 'Student's Day' across the Indian state on 27 October 2017. Despite having a very high standard of scholarship and knowledge, Ambedkar considered himself a lifelong student, and as he became an ideal student, the government declared his school admission day as Student Day. On this day, essay competitions, oratory, poetry reading competitions on various aspects based on Ambedkar's life are organized in all schools and junior colleges in the state.

== History ==
On 7 November 1900, Ambedkar entered the Government High School (now Pratap Singh High School) at Rajwada Chowk in Satara, Maharashtra in the first English standard. Here he learned till 1904, i.e. up to the fourth standard. The school records his name as "Bhiva Ramji Ambedkar". The school register has the signature of child Bhiva [Bhimrao] in front of the number 1914. This historical document has been preserved through laminating all the pages by Dalit Foundation in 2007 with the permission of the school administration and it has been kept in the main office of the school with full respect. Dalit Foundation is an organization works to strengthen Dalit youth leadership to eradicate untouchability practices. Journalist and president of the Satara Pravartan Sangathan, Arun Jawale has been organizing Ambedkar's school admission day or school entry day since 2003. He had repeatedly demanded the Maharashtra government to declare this day as Student's Day. Later, on 27 October 2017, the Government of Maharashtra declared this day as Student's Day.

== Purpose ==
Arun Jawale had demanded that 7 November be declared as State Students' Day by the then Maharashtra Social Justice Minister Rajkumar Badole and the then Education Minister Vinod Tawde. The government decided to celebrate this day as Student's Day on 27 November 2017 to commemorate B. R. Ambedkar's school entry and to make the students aware of the fact that 'education is the only means of upliftment and their hard work'.

== See also ==
- Ambedkar Jayanti
- World Students' Day
