= Ambedkar Nagar Hospital =

Public hospital in Delhi, India

Coordinates: 28.52262°N 77.23891°E

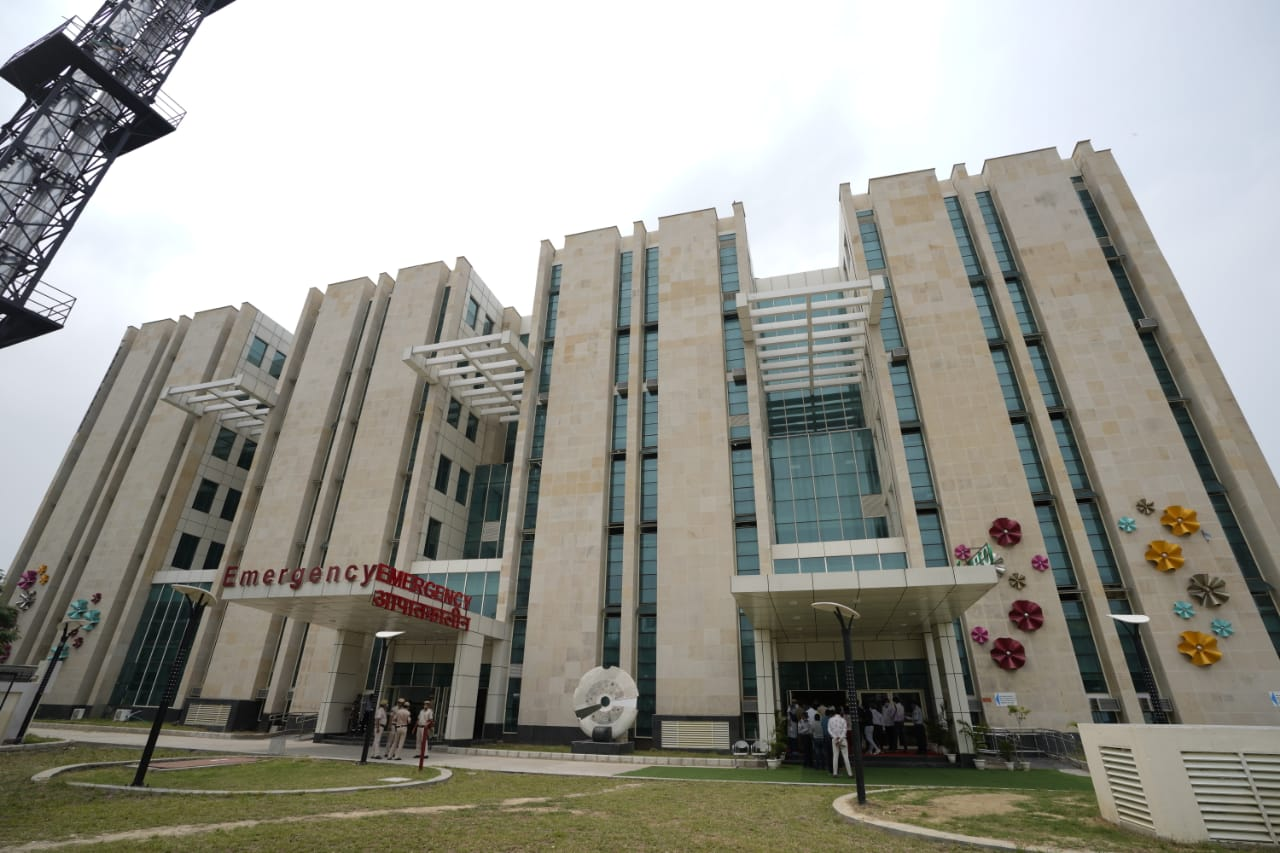
- Newly constructed building of Ambedkar Nagar Hospital

Geography
- Location: Ambedkar Nagar, Delhi, India

Organisation
- Type: General

Services
- Beds: 600

History
- Opened: 9 August 2020

Links
- Lists: Hospitals in India

Ambedkar Nagar Hospital is a government-run multi-specialty hospital located in the Ambedkar Nagar assembly constituency in Delhi, India.

== History ==
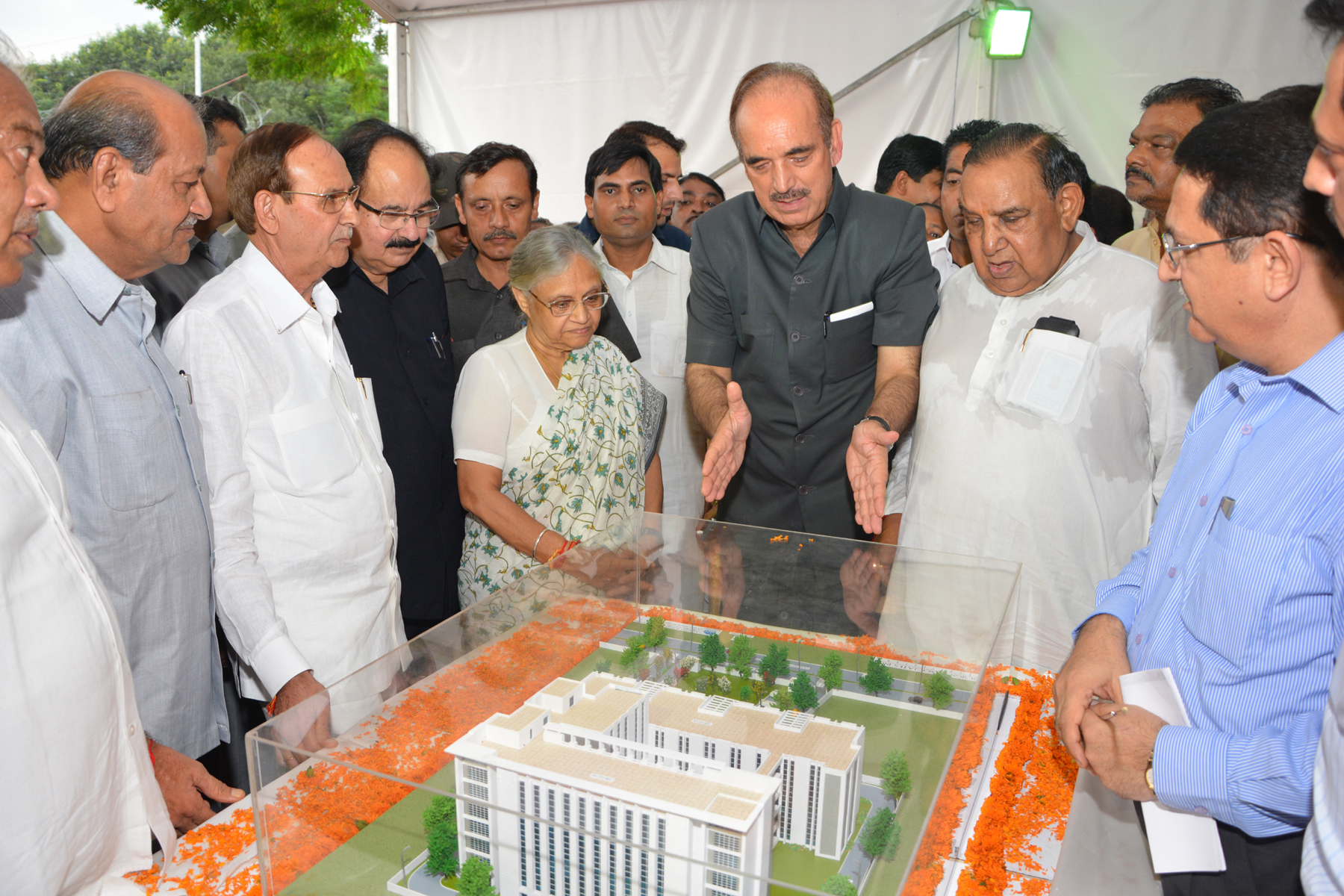
The Union Minister for Health and the Chief Minister of Delhi inspecting the model of Ambedkar Nagar Hospital, in New Delhi in August 2013.

The foundation stone of the hospital was laid in August 2013 by Union Minister for Health and Family Welfare, Ghulam Nabi Azad, along with the then Chief Minister of Delhi Sheila Dikshit. In 2020, on 9 August, the Chief Minister of Delhi Arvind Kejriwal inaugurated the hospital. The hospital was constructed over the following years as part of the expansion of public healthcare infrastructure in Delhi.

The hospital was inaugurated on 9 August 2020 by the Chief Minister of Delhi, Arvind Kejriwal. Its initial operational phase coincided with the COVID-19 pandemic.

== Facilities ==
The hospital has been planned as a 600-bed multi-specialty facility. In 2023, the Delhi government announced the introduction of a special OPD at the facility.
