= 2006 Dalit protests in Maharashtra =

In November and December 2006, the desecration of an Ambedkar statue in Kanpur triggered off violent protests by Dalits in Maharashtra, India.

== Background ==
There was resentment among the Dalit in Maharashtra, due to murder of four Dalits, allegedly by a mob of Kunbis in Khairlanji village in September 2006. On 28 November 2006, the brewing resentment in the Dalit community in Maharashtra took form of violent protests, when a statue of Dalit icon B. R. Ambedkar was desecrated by a vandal in Kanpur. Several people remarked that the protests were fueled by the Khairlanji killings, including the Maharashtra Chief Minister Vilasrao Deshmukh, and the Mumbai Police Commissioner A. N. Roy. According to The Hindu, the political parties had not responded appropriately to the outrage over the Khairlanji killings, resulting in heightened tensions. Later, the Maharashtra Navnirman Sena (MNS) chief Raj Thackeray claimed that the protests were stoked by certain political parties in their bid to oust Maharashtra Home Minister R. R. Patil.

== Protests ==
On 30 November 2006, violent protests took place in several places in Maharashtra. The Dalit protestors set three trains on fire, damaged over 100 buses and clashed with police.

=== North Maharashtra ===
In Osmanabad, two persons were killed in police firing on a protesting mob. Two more deaths were reported, one each in Nanded and Nashik, during the violent protests. Subsequently, a curfew was imposed in Osmanabad, Nanded and Nandurbar towns of Maharashtra.

In Aurangabad, a crowd of 1,000 Dalit gathered to protest against desecration. Some of the protestors started pelting stones at passing vehicles, injuring six persons, including sub-inspector and a constable. The police resorted to firing in air to disperse the crowd. In Akola, a truck was set on fire on the national highway, and there was heavy stone-pelting on State Transport buses.

Heavy deployment of police forces took place in affected areas. Around 1,500 people were put under preventive arrest and three persons were detained in connection with the lynching of a youth in Nashik. In Akola, the police arrested 14 persons for burning an effigy of chief minister Vilasrao Deshmukh.

=== Pune District ===
In Pune and Pimpri-Chinchwad areas, 60 vehicles were damaged and set ablaze by agitators and 13 policemen were injured. A curfew was imposed in Pimpri on 30 November. On 1 December, a municipal corporation bus was stoned at Bopodi chowk in Pimpri-Chinchwad.

=== Mumbai and its neighborhoods ===
On 30 November, a mob of over 6000 protestors stopped the Deccan Queen passenger train near Ulhasnagar, asked the passengers to alight and set afire its five bogies. One compartment of a local train was set ablaze at Matunga in Mumbai. There were no injuries. Some compartments of a commuter train were also torched at Ulhasnagar, and the police fired in the air to control the violent crowds. The mob in Ulhasnagar also vandalised the railway station. Suburban train services were affected in parts of Mumbai as protestors squatted on the tracks. Shops and establishments in the city were also closed in view of the protests.

Incidents of protestors setting up road blocks and pelting stones were reported in Mumbai suburbs like Kanjurmarg, Mulund, Bhandup, Trombay, Kurla, Kalina, Chembur, Kurar in Malad, Goregaon, Pali Hill in Bandra, and Worli. The police reported that gangster Chhota Rajan's brother Deepak Nikhalje was responsible for violence in Chembur. Police used lathi charge and fired in the air at Kherwadi junction on the Western Express highway in Vakola, after an angry mob blocked traffic and indulged in stone pelting. In Thane, corporation-run buses were off the road due to stone pelting. A Municipal Transport Corporation bus going from Kalyan to Dombivili was set on fire at Manpada by a violent mob. Protestors also forced owners of shops and establishments to down shutters.

Over 100 buses and 35 private vehicles were damaged in stone pelting. The Mumbai Police Commissioner A. N. Roy put the loss at around Rs 30 lakh. BEST said 91 of its buses were damaged and four drivers and a woman passenger injured in stone pelting. At least 13 policemen, including Additional Commissioner of Police K. L. Bishnoi, were injured in the protests.

176 people were arrested in Mumbai. The Thane police arrested 19 persons and detained another 29.

=== Outside Maharashtra ===
The protests also spread to some parts of Maharashtra's neighboring states, Gujarat and Karnataka. In Surat, Gujarat; a mob pelted stones and damaged vehicles. Eight persons were arrested in connection with the violence. In Hubli, Karnataka; activists belonging to various Dalit organizations stoned a dozen city buses.

== Arrest of the vandal ==
Many Dalit leaders, including the UP RPI vice-president S. R. Darapuri remarked that the desecration of Ambedkar statue displayed the deep-seated animosity towards Dalits in India. Janata Party president Subramanian Swamy claimed that the desecration was the work of "anti-national" elements.

Later, the Kanpur Police arrested a Dalit youth Arun Kumar Balmiki for desecrating the Ambedkar statue. According to the police, the youth had "admitted to having damaged the statue in a drunken state along with two friends". Earlier in a similar case, a Dalit youth was held for desecrating an Ambedkar statue in Gulbarga, Karnataka. However, some Dalits in Kanpur alleged that the youth was falsely implicated to protect the real culprits. Some Dalits protesting against Balmiki's arrest damaged vehicles and blocked traffic in Kanpur. Meanwhile, the old desecrated statue in Kanpur was buried with full honors and quickly replaced with a new one.

== Political fallout ==
The Maharashtra Chief Minister Vilasrao Deshmukh requested Dalit leaders to maintain calm. The Police Commissioner of Mumbai, A. N. Roy, requested the state government to declare a holiday on December 6 (Dr. Ambedkar's death anniversary), but the Government decided against doing so. Deshmukh also called an all-party meeting. The Congress president Sonia Gandhi also pitched in to settle the issue.

Raj Thackeray accused the "anti-R. R. Patil forces" of fueling the riots. He also drew attention to another incident in Khairlanji, in which a Dalit man allegedly raped a girl and killed her. Thackeray demanded action on those responsible for the rape and the subsequent death of the girl, and also remarked that nobody helped the girl's family.

In Kanpur, a Congress delegation, led by former bureaucrat P. L. Punia sat on a dharna (strike), when the District Magistrate and the Senior Superintendent of Police prevented them from visiting the site of desecration. RPI president Ramdas Athawale also reached Kanpur to visit the site of desecration. Earlier, he had said that he will hold protests in Kanpur against the "heinous" act. However, he alleged house arrest, after police put him under tight security in a local circuit house in Kanpur.

At the 22nd National Conference of Dalit Writers in New Delhi, the former Governor of Arunachal Pradesh, Mata Prasad declared that the agitation will continue through Dalit literature.

== See also ==
- Vandalism of Ambedkar statues
