= Dr. Ambedkar Mani Mandapam =

Monument in Chennai

- Annal Ambedkar Manimandapam
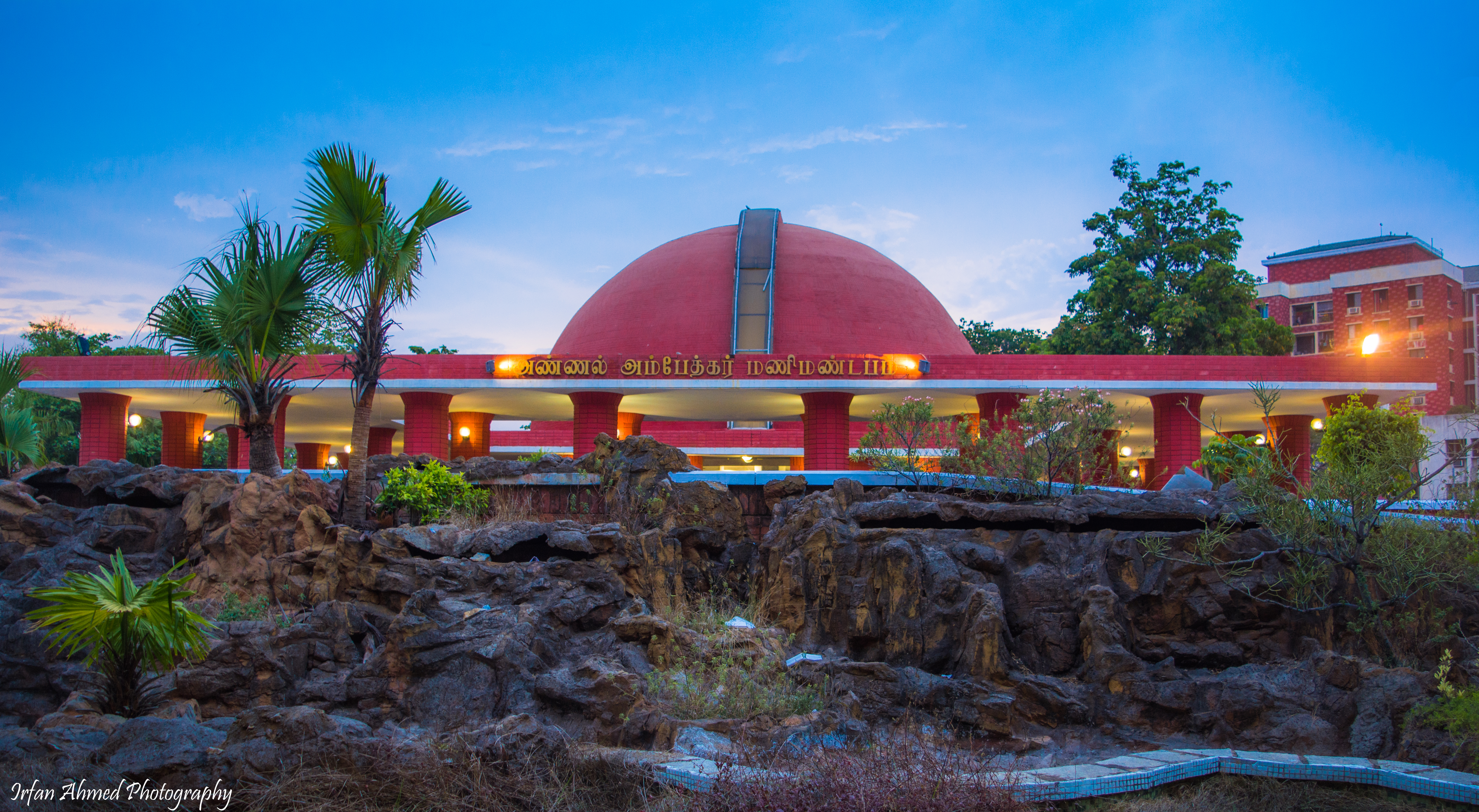
- Ambedkar memorial in Chennai
- Interactive map of Dr. Ambedkar Mani Mandapam
- Location: Adyar, Chennai, India
- Coordinates: 13°1′9″N 80°16′1″E
- Type: Memorial
- Material: Concrete
- Beginning date: December 1998 (Foundation stone laid)
- Opening date: June 2000
- Dedicated to: B. R. Ambedkar

Dr. Ambedkar Manimandapam is a memorial in the Adyar neighborhood of Chennai, India, dedicated to B. R. Ambedkar, the architect of the Indian Constitution. It is located in the Adyar estuary on Greenways Road in Mandhavelipakkam.

== History ==
In 1993, the Government of Tamil Nadu run by the AIADMK party decided to build a memorial and an auditorium for Ambedkar on 5 acres (2.0 ha) of land identified in Adyar creek. The foundation stone was laid by the then Chief Minister, J. Jayalalithaa, in April 1993. However, environmental groups in the city challenged the decision in court. In March 1994, permission was granted by Justice Kanakaraj in a landmark judgment, allowing construction of a memorial on a 1.5-acre (0.61 ha) area at one end of the identified site, without constructing the auditorium or any other construction. The matter went to the court again for some other issues, and with disposal of the case, the foundation stone was laid again in December 1998. The memorial was then built on 0.75 acres (0.30 ha) of land and the remaining 0.75 acres (0.30 ha) was made available for provision for lawns and landscaping.

After entangling in legal disputes for several years, the work on the construction of the memorial was entrusted to the Public Works Department in June 1999, with an allocation of ₹ 45 million. The initial site preparation was carried out by the Tamil Nadu Adi-Dravidar Housing and Development Corporation (THADCO). The memorial was declared open by the then Chief Minister, M. Karunanidhi, on 10 June 2000.

== The memorial ==
Built over a plinth area of 8,285 square feet (769.7 m^{2}), the memorial has a semi-circle dome with a diameter of 55 ft. About a dozen photographs of Ambedkar are kept in display, including Ambedkar with Periyar E. V. Ramasamy and his participation in the First Round Table Conference in London in the 1930s.
