= Institutionalized discrimination in the United States =

Institutionalized discrimination refers to the unjust and discriminatory mistreatment of an individual or group of individuals by society and its institutions as a whole, through unequal selection or bias, intentional or unintentional; as opposed to individuals making a conscious choice to discriminate. It stems from systemic stereotypical beliefs (such as sexist or racist beliefs) that are held by the vast majority living in a society where stereotypes and discrimination are the norm (see institutionalized racism).

Such discrimination is typically codified into the operating procedures, policies, laws, or objectives of such institutions. Members of minority groups such as populations of African descent in the U.S. are at a much higher risk of encountering these types of sociostructural disadvantage. Among the severe and long-lasting detrimental effects of institutionalized discrimination on affected populations are increased suicide rates, suppressed attainment of wealth and decreased access to health care.

== Examples ==
Examples of institutionalized discrimination include laws and decisions that reflect racism, such as the Plessy v. Ferguson U.S. Supreme Court case. The court ruled in favor of separate but equal public facilities between African Americans and non-African Americans. This ruling was overturned by the Brown v. Board of Education Supreme Court decision. Institutionalized discrimination often exists within the government, though it can also occur in any other type of social institution including religion, education and marriage.

Achievement gaps in education may represent an example of institutionalized discrimination. Two recent studies aimed to explain the complications of assessing educational progress within the United States. One study focused on high school graduation rates, whereas the other study compared dropout rates in suburban and urban schools. By taking a closer look at statistics of test scores and academic achievement, researchers noticed that wealthy whites do better than blacks, poor whites, and Latinos.

According to Star Parker, reporter of the Durham Herald Sun, graduation rates among whites and Asians are about 25 percent higher than those of blacks, Hispanics, and American Indians. This signifies that academic achievement is linked to socioeconomic status.

== Spillover effects ==
Institutionalized discrimination also exists in institutions aside from the government such as religion, education, and marriage among many other. Routines that encourage the selection of one individual over another, for instance in an employment situation, is a form of institutionalized discrimination. The phenomenon occurs unintentionally at times.

Thomas Shapiro’s The Hidden Cost of Being African American addresses many of the problems faced by African Americans in the United States and how their current social and economic situations compare to one another. These issues include the racial wealth gap between blacks and whites, assets, and education. Housing in the United States is valued differently based on the racial makeup of the neighborhood. There can be two identical houses in terms of amenities and size but the value of each house depends on the racial makeup of the people within the community. Tactics like blockbusting, a method where real estate agents survey white homeowners in an area can cause a shift in the composition of a neighborhood. Although the concept of blockbusting has been illegal since 1968 unintentional segregation continues to define neighborhoods today.

== Solutions ==
The Cedar Grove Institute for Sustainable Communities has developed a plan to fight institutionalized discrimination in the Mebane, North Carolina area, and included minorities in local planning that have historically been excluded rendering them insufficient police and fire protection. Their land values are lower than others leading to zoning for schools and other related issues.

As community boundaries are not visible, a mapping process from the Geographical Information System (GIS) divides it. It combines several types of information into a single picture. The base map is physical features (roads, city limits, county boundaries) onto which other variables (e.g. race, income, water service, etc.). If needed, the processing system can also show other types of economic variables to draw conclusions about the area. Once the individuals begin to understand this information and realize what is happening to them, they have the power to hold the government accountable and can fight back against the institutionalized discrimination.

== See also ==
- Discrimination in the United States
- Environmental racism in the United States
- Achievement gaps in the United States
- Residential segregation in the United States
- Zoning in the United States
- Affirmative action in the United States
