= Jai Bhim (soundtrack) =

Soundtrack album by Sean Roldan
- Released: 1 November 2021
- Recorded: 2021
- Genre: Feature film soundtrack
- Length: 22:38
- Language: Tamil
- Label: Sony Music India
- Producer: Sean Roldan

Sean Roldan chronology
Kasada Thapara (2021)	Jai Bhim (2021)	August 16 1947 (2023)
External audio
- Audio Jukebox on YouTube

Jai Bhim is the soundtrack to the 2021 Tamil-language legal drama film of the same name directed by T. J. Gnanavel and starred Suriya whose production company 2D Entertainment also produced the film. The film features musical score composed by Sean Roldan, with lyrics written by Yugabharathi, Raju Murugan and Arivu. Preceded by three singles—"Power", "Thala Kodhum" and "Sendumalli"—the soundtrack was released by Sony Music India on 1 November 2021, with a bonus song "Manniley Eeramundu" unveiled after the film's release. The music received positive response from critics.

== Production and release ==
The film marks Roldan's maiden collaboration with Gnanavel and Suriya. Gnanavel chose Roldan to score the film as he was one among the few musicians to score for realistic films, citing his work on Joker (2016). The film featured five songs without lip movements to proceed the story, while there is a montage song "Vettakaara Kootam" which is about of the life of Irula people. For the song, Roldan used the Irula language as a musical form and continuously implemented it throughout the first part of the story. The other sequences, that is set in the High court is contrarily different in music. Roldan had recorded the court sequences at the Abbey Road Studios, London which was orchestrated by Matt Dunkley. A snippet from the recording sessions uploaded to social media during mid-October.

The songs were recorded during August–October 2021, with the first track "Power" with vocals and lyrics written by Arivu. The song was released as the first single from the album on 6 October 2021. The second single "Thala Kodhum" sung by Pradeep Kumar was released on 18 October. The third song "Sendumalli" sung by Ananthu and Kalyani Nair was released on 27 October. The original soundtrack album consisting of five tracks was intended to be released on 29 October but was ultimately postponed following the death of Kannada actor-producer Puneeth Rajkumar. The soundtrack was eventually released on 1 November 2021.

After the film's release, Sean Roldan performed few lines from the unreleased hidden track titled "Manniley Eeramundu" which was played during the climax of the film, at a chat session and following multiple requests, the makers released the aforementioned track as a single on 15 November 2021.

== Track listing ==
No.	Title	Lyrics	Singer(s)	Length
1.	"Power"	Arivu	Arivu	3:38
2.	"Vettakaara Kootam"	Yugabharathi	Anthony Daasan, Niranjana Ramanan	3:26
3.	"Polladha Ulagathiley"	Yugabharathi	Sean Roldan	5:07
4.	"Sendumalli"	Yugabharathi	Ananthu, Kalyani Nair	4:11
5.	"Thala Kodhum"	Raju Murugan	Pradeep Kumar	3:49
6.	"Manniley Eeramundu"	Yugabharathi	Vaikom Vijayalakshmi	2:24
Total length:				22:38

== Reception ==
S. Srivatsan of The Hindu described Roldan's music as "pummelling". Ranjani Krishnakumar of Film Companion South described the introduction song "Power" as "an intense rally cry". Behindwoods called Roldan's music as "brilliant" that "elevates the film several notches higher" IndiaGlitz wrote "Sean Roldan has produced great songs for the film and the composer treats us with an admirable background score as well. He offers silence wherever it is necessary underlining the narration." Litty Simon of Manorama Online said that Roldan's music "is just perfect, tugging right at the core of the movie". Sudhir Srinivasan of Cinema Express, although describing the music on Chandru's introduction as "heroic" but sometimes felt "overstated". Ashameera Aiyyappan of Firstpost called Roldan's "charming album [...] and minimalist score further ably support the film". She further stated "Sendumalli" as "pure saccharine goodness". Umesh Punwani of Koimoi wrote "Sean Roldan’s music is haunting and he manages to elevate the whole film with it".

== Background score ==
The original background score for the film was released on 20 January 2022.

No.	Title	Length
1.	"Alli is Kidnapped"	0:55
2.	"Bhasyam Exposed"	1:10
3.	"Chandru Begins"	0:30
4.	"Chandru Brings a New Witness"	0:42
5.	"Chandru Digs Deep"	2:42
6.	"Chandru The Lawyer"	0:48
7.	"Chandru's Encounter With the SP"	1:27
8.	"Connecting the Dots"	2:48
9.	"Courage of the Innocent"	0:54
10.	"Cry of the Damned"	0:57
11.	"Death of Raja Kannu"	1:24
12.	"Dignity"	1:02
13.	"Habeus Corpus"	0:53
14.	"IG Perumalsamy"	4:00
15.	"Irulas"	0:48
16.	"Investigation Comes to an End"	1:52
17.	"Justice is Served"	3:45
18.	"No Compromises"	1:30
19.	"People of the Soil"	1:32
20.	"Perumalsamy Investigates"	2:43
21.	"Senga Soolai"	1:47
22.	"Sengeni Pleads in Vein"	0:47
23.	"Sengeni's Shock"	0:40
24.	"The Continuing Atrocities of Polic"	1:55
25.	"The Final Torture"	4:58
26.	"The Jewel Robbery"	1:14
27.	"The Orphaned Kind"	0:41
28.	"The Pain and Shame of Torture"	1:05
29.	"The Police Cover Up"	3:39
30.	"The Protest"	1:49
31.	"The Ricemill Owner's Story"	0:51
32.	"War on the System"	0:36
Total length:		52:34
