= Ambedkar Jayanti =

B. R. Ambedkar's birthday, festival and holiday

Dr Babasaheb Ambedkar Jayanti
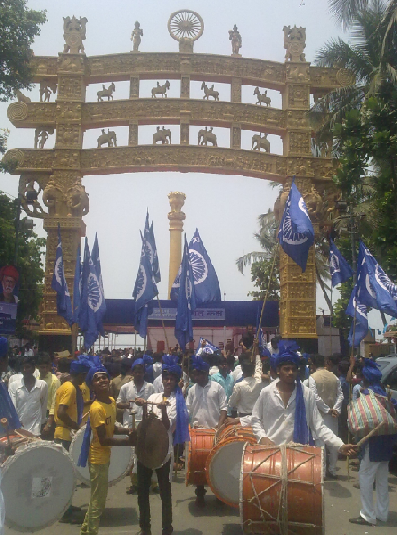
- Ambedkar Jayanti Procession at Chaitya Bhoomi
- Official name: Dr Babasaheb Ambedkar Jayanti
- Also called: Bhim Jayanti
- Observed by: India
- Type: Secular; birth anniversary of B.R. Ambedkar
- Celebrations: Dr Babasaheb Ambedkar Jayanti
- Observances: Community, historical celebrations
- Date: 14 April
- Frequency: Annual
- Related to: Symbol Of Knowledge; Ashok Vijaya Dashmi; Constitution Day (India)

Ambedkar Jayanti, also known as Bhim Jayanti, is observed on 14 April to commemorate the memory of B. R. Ambedkar, Indian politician and social reformer. It marks Ambedkar's birthday who was born on 14 April 1891. His birthday is also referred to as Equality Day by some in India.

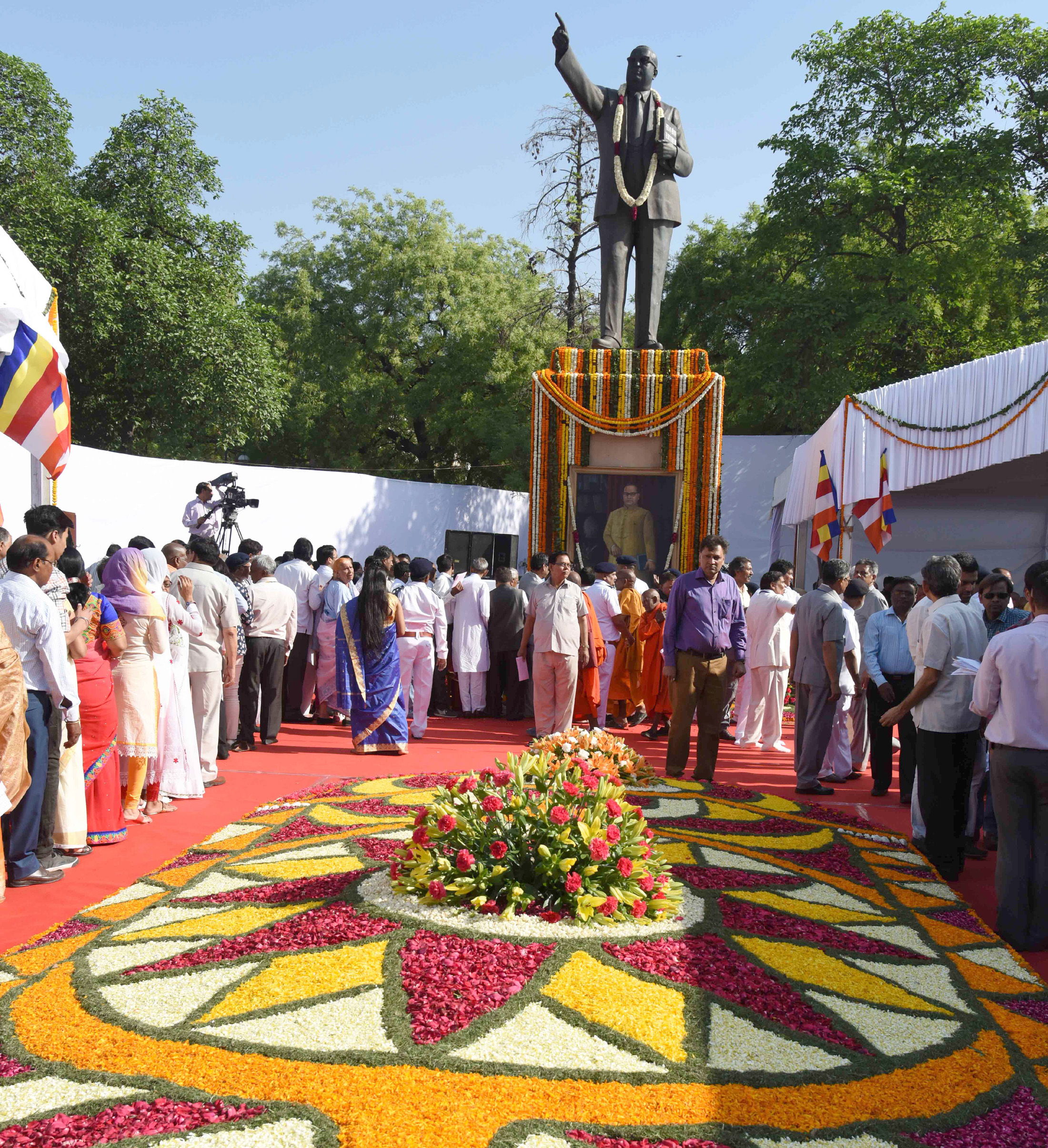
The Citizens paid tributes to Ambedkar on the occasion of his 125th birth anniversary, at Parliament House, in New Delhi on April 14, 2016.

Ambedkar Jayanti processions are carried out by his followers at Chaitya Bhoomi in Mumbai and Deeksha Bhoomi in Nagpur. It is a customary for senior national figures, such as the President, Prime Minister and leaders of major political parties, to pay homage at the statue of Ambedkar at the Parliament of India in New Delhi. It is celebrated throughout the world especially by dalits, adivasi, labour workers, women and also those who embraced Buddhism after his example. In India, large numbers of people visit local statues commemorating Ambedkar in procession with lot of fanfare. In 2020, the first online Ambedkar Jayanti was celebrated in the world.

Ambedkar Jayanti is a public holiday in more than 25 states and union territories of India, including Andaman and Nicobar Islands, Andhra Pradesh, Bihar, Chandigarh, Chhattisgarh, Goa, Gujarat, Haryana, Himachal Pradesh, Jammu and Kashmir, Jharkhand, Karnataka, Kerala, Ladakh, Madhya Pradesh, Maharashtra, Odisha, Puducherry, Punjab, Rajasthan, Sikkim, Tamil Nadu, Telangana, Uttarakhand, Uttar Pradesh, West Bengal etc.

== Background ==
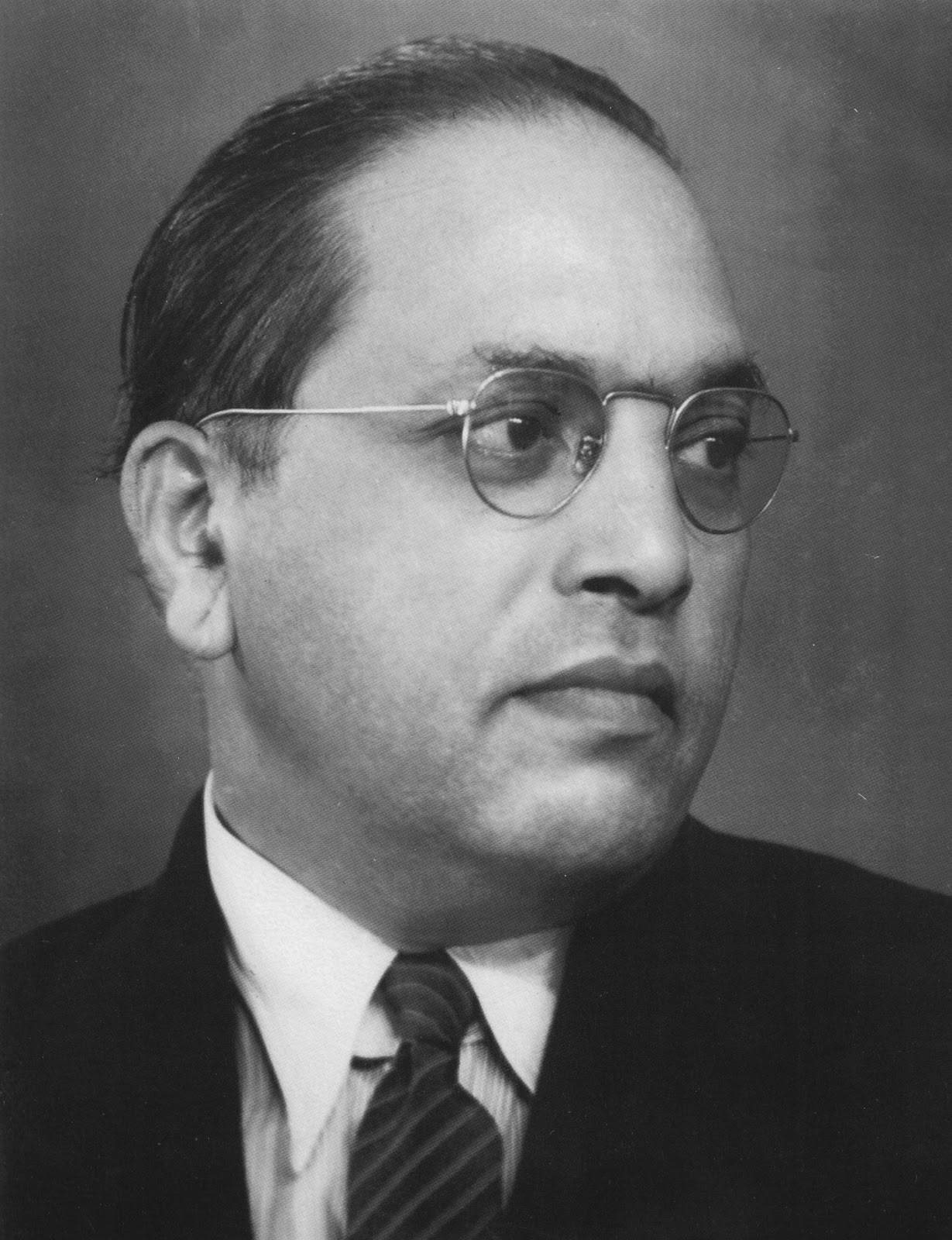
B. R. Ambedkar (1891–1956)

Babasaheb Ambedkar's first birthday was publicly celebrated on 14 April 1928 in Pune, by Janardan Sadashiv Ranapisay, who was an Ambedkarite and social activist. He started the tradition of Babasaheb's birth anniversary of Ambedkar Jayanti.

== Tributes ==
Indian Post issued stamps dedicated to Ambedkar's birthday in 1966, 1973, 1991, 2001, and 2013, and featured him on other stamps in 2009, 2015, 2016, 2017 and 2020.

On 14 April 1990, Ambedkar was bestowed with Bharat Ratna award. The same year his life size portrait was also unveiled in the Central Hall of Parliament. The period from 14 April 1990 – 14 April 1991 was observed as "Year of Social Justice" in the memory of Babasaheb.

Government of India Issued 10 Rupees and 125 Rupees coins in 2015 to mark the 125 Birth Anniversary in the honor of Ambedkar.

On 14 April 2015, a Google Doodle was published for Ambedkar's 124th birthday. The doodle was featured in India, Argentina, Chile, Ireland, Peru, Poland, Sweden and the United Kingdom.

The United Nations celebrated Ambedkar Jayanti in 2016, 2017 and 2018.

In 2017, As per Government of Maharashtra 14 April is observed as Knowledge Day (Dnyan Din) in the Indian state of Maharashtra in memory of Ambedkar.

In 2017, on the occasion of Ambedkar Jayanti, Twitter launched Ambedkar emoji as a tribute to him.

On 6 April 2020, in Burnaby,Canada, it was decided to observe April 14 as "Dr. B.R. Ambedkar Day of Equality". The decision was taken by the Council of the City of Burnaby, Canada.

In 2021, Government of British Columbia has decided to observe April 14 as "Dr. B. R. Ambedkar Equality Day" in the province of British Columbia, Canada.

In 2022, Canada's British Columbia province has recognised April as Dalit History Month.

In 2022, The Government of British Columbia (Canada) observes 14 April as "Dr. B.R. Ambedkar Equality Day" in British Columbia, Canada.

In 2022, The Government of Colorado (United States) observes 14 April 2022 as "Dr. B.R. Ambedkar Equity Day" in Colorado, the United States.

In 2022, The Government of Tamil Nadu (India) observes Ambedkar Jayanti (14 April) as "Equity Day" in Tamil Nadu state.

In 2025, The Government of New York City (United States) declared 14 April as "Dr. Bhimrao Ramji Ambedkar Day" in New York City, the United States.

== See also ==
- Students' Day (Maharashtra)
- Buddha's Birthday
- Constitution Day (India)
