= Jai Bhim Comrade =

2011 Indian film by Anand Patwardhan

- DVD cover
- Directed by: Anand Patwardhan
- Produced by: Anand Patwardhan
- Cinematography: Simantini Dhuru, Anand Patwardhan
- Edited by: Anand Patwardhan
- Music by: Vilas Ghogre
- Release date: September 2011 (Film South Asia)
- Running time: 199 minutes
- Country: India
- Languages: English, Hindi, Marathi

Jai Bhim Comrade is a 2011 Indian documentary film directed by Anand Patwardhan. The film begins with a description of police violence in the 1997 Ramabai killings. It goes on to explore various aspects of the lives and politics of Dalit people in Mumbai. The film took 14 years to produce, and was released in 2011 after the conclusion of the court trials that followed the Ramabai incident. The film was widely shown both nationally and internationally, and received an overwhelmingly positive reaction. It has won numerous national and international awards.

== Synopsis ==
=== Ramabai colony killings ===
Jai Bhim Comrade begins with a description of the Indian caste system and its oppression of the Dalit community. The film includes a song by Dalit poet and activist Vilas Ghogre, followed by a shot of a newspaper clipping describing his suicide in reaction to the Ramabai killings in 1997. The documentary then describes the killings; on 11 July 1997 a statue of B. R. Ambedkar in the Dalit colony of Ramabai had a garland of footwear placed over it, an act considered to be a desecration. An initially peaceful protest was fired upon by a team of Special Reserve Police Force members, killing ten protesters, and other protests later in the day saw further police violence. Commentators stated that the violence was motivated by caste-based prejudices, as the leader of the police team stood accused of several cases of mistreatment of Dalit people. The Dalit singer, poet, and activist Vilas Ghogre hanged himself in protest at the incident. After narrating the incidents surrounding the killing, the documentary follows Patwardhan on his visits to the families of those killed in the firing, as well as to Ghogre's wife. The film tries to reconstruct the incident by interviewing witnesses on both sides. The footage shot by a civilian bystander is used to contradict the description of the incident given by the police.

The film then shows interviews with many of Ghoghre's colleagues, who discuss the state of Dalit politics in India. In a voice-over, Patwardhan describes the life of Ambedkar, and his activism against the caste system. The interviews are interspersed with other Dalits describing difficulties and discrimination they face in their lives. This section of the documentary also explores the relationship between the Dalit activist movement. The film describes the complicity of the Shiv Sena in the Ramabai killings, and shows Bal Thackeray at a public rally stating that Muslims need to be exterminated. The film then contrasts the Shiv Sena's attempts to portray itself as the champion of the Dalit cause, with the speeches and songs of the Dalit leaders attempting to counteract this.

=== Kabir Kala Manch ===
The second part of the film focuses on contemporary Dalit activism, chiefly the activities of the Kabir Kala Manch, a troupe of singers using their performances to raise awareness and support for their cause. Many clips of songs and protests are shown, together with interviews with the leaders of the troupe. The film describes the initial successes of the troupe during the protests that followed the Khairlanji massacre in 2006. The ideology of the group was a mixture of that of Ambedkar fused with left-wing ideology. However, the group was soon branded a Naxalite outfit, and led to it being targeted by the Anti-terrorist squad. Several members were forced to go on the run, while others were arrested. The film ends with interviews with the mothers of two of the members of Kabir Kala Manch that had been forced to go underground.

== Production ==
Jai Bhim Comrade was filmed over a period of 14 years, from 1997 to its release in 2011. Part of the reason it took that length of time was that Patwardhan wanted to wait for the outcome of the trials that followed the Ramabai incident before finishing the documentary. The documentary also uses a significant amount of archival footage from Patwardhan's previous documentary Bombay Our City, released in 1985. Music is featured heavily, almost as much as spoken words. Patwardhan stated that one of the reasons for the film's 200 minute length was that he felt like he could not cut any of the footage while editing it, as it all contributed to the atmosphere of the film.

== Reception and analysis ==
In a review of the film, Human Rights Watch criticised its style, saying that the use of music got repetitive, and that the length of the film made it inaccessible. However, the review stated that the content was "astoundingly important," and that "Jai Bhim Comrade is an incredibly important work that brings to attention a broad culture of atrocious oppression, dismantling entirely any argument that caste-discrimination is a thing of the past." A review in Outlook magazine suggested that an important aspect of the film was the exploration of the tension between the Ambedkarite Dalit activist movement, and the mainstream left-wing movement exemplified in the various communist outfits. The Dalit activists shown in the film, such as the Kabir Kala Manch, represented the true intersection of Dalit and left-wing activism. The review also commented that some Dalit activists had begun to associate with the Shiv Sena despite its leader Bal Thackeray making hate-speeches against Muslims, and contrasted them with the Kabir Kala Manch, which was the "new hope on the horizon." The scholar Balmurli Natarajan, writing in the journal Economic and Political Weekly, stated that the film spoke to the need for solidarity between the Dalit movement and the leftist movement, and that the unpunctuated title of the film spoke to this. A review in The Guardian said that the film "exposed the glaring realities...about the continuing oppression of the poorer castes," and that it could be seen as "a capstone to Patwardhan's extraordinary career." The anthropologist Deborah Matzner said that the film contrasted the "thetrical Hindutva" of the Shiv Sena with the "poignant and defiant" political music of the Kabir Kala Manch, and said that "blatant and appalling hate speech [of Bal Thackeray] serves as the dark corollary to Dalit leaders’ skillful, rousing oratory and song." A review in the film magazine Jump Cut stated that "This film explores and valorizes one of the best examples of cultural and political struggle today." Film critic Mark Cousins wrote that the film "is about the Dalit people like Dickens is about London. It’s a Marxist musical that bubbles like a stream and then – over its 3 hour running time –opens and deepens like a river." He called Patwardhan "the greatest Asian documentarist" and bemoaned the fact that "[m]ost [...] major film festivals in the West" rejected the film, writing that they "often show docs about small parts of Western life, yet [...] couldn't find space for this polygeneric film of much greater amplitude that covers decades, generations, great iniquity and the historical picaresque." He goes on to suggest the film's complexity and many Westerners' unfamiliarity with the subject matter as possible reasons for it being ignored.

British-Ghanaian writer and filmmaker Kodwo Eshun voted for the film on Sight & Sound's poll of "The Greatest Documentaries of All Time", as did two other critics (Julia Lesage and Cheuk To-Li).

== Awards ==
- Ram Bahadur Grand Prize, Film South Asia, Kathmandu, Nepal, 2011
- Best Film/Video, Mumbai International Film Festival, India, 2012
- Firebird Award for Best documentary, Hong Kong International Film Festival, 2012
- Special Jury Prize, National Film Awards, India, 2012
- Bartok Prize, Jean Rouch Film International Film Festival, 2012

=== Nominations ===
Docufest Competition, 48th Chicago International Film Festival, 2012.
