= Aaydan =

Autobiographical novel by Urmila Pawar

- Author: Urmila Pawar
- Translator: Maya Pandit
- Language: Marathi
- Genre: Autobiography, Memoir
- Publisher: Granthali (Marathi); Columbia University Press (English)
- Publication date: 2003 (Marathi)
- Publication place: India
- English publication date: 2009 (English)
- Media type: Print
- ISBN: 9780231520577
- OCLC: 979776511

Aaydan (lit. 'bamboo basketry' or 'things made of bamboo') is an autobiographical novel by Indian dalit writer and feminist Urmila Pawar. It was originally published in 2003 in Marathi language. The English language translation titled The Weave of My Life: A Dalit Woman's Memoirs by Maya Pandit was published in 2009 with a foreword by Wandana Sonalkar. The book is a significant work in Dalit literature and chronicles Pawar's life as a Dalit woman, detailing her experiences with caste discrimination, poverty, and gender-based oppression within both mainstream society and the Dalit community itself.

In her foreword to the English translation, Wandana Sonalkar writes that the title of the book The Weave is a metaphor of the writing technique employed by Pawar, "the lives of different members of her family, her husband's family, her neighbours and classmates, are woven together in a narrative that gradually reveals different aspects of the everyday life of Dalits, the manifold ways in which caste asserts itself and grinds them down"

== Synopsis ==
Aaydan chronicles Urmila Pawar's life from her childhood in the Konkan region of Maharashtra to her life in Mumbai as a writer and government employee. The narrative begins with her early years in a poor Mahar Dalit family, where she experienced the harsh realities of untouchability and social exclusion. Pawar recounts the influence of B. R. Ambedkar on her community and family, particularly their conversion to Navayana Buddhism, which was a pivotal moment of social and spiritual rebellion against the caste system. The autobiography details her struggles for education, which she saw as a means of emancipation. Pawar describes the dual discrimination she faced—as a Dalit in a caste-ridden society and as a woman in a patriarchal world. She writes about the challenges and humiliations of her school years, her family life, and her marriage. A significant portion of the book is dedicated to her experiences as a working woman in Mumbai and her growing involvement in the Dalit and feminist movements. Through personal anecdotes, Pawar illustrates the complexities of navigating her identity, highlighting moments of both personal triumph and systemic injustice.

== Reception ==
Aaydan was met with critical acclaim in both its original Marathi and its English translation. It is regarded as a landmark text in the canon of Dalit literature and a foundational work of Dalit feminism. Scholars have praised Pawar's unflinching honesty and her nuanced exploration of the complexities of identity. The book has been compared to other notable Dalit autobiographies like Bama's Karukku and Baby Kamble's The Prisons We Broke, with critics noting its specific focus on the intersection of caste and gender from the perspective of an educated, urban Dalit woman.

The English translation was lauded for its sensitivity and its ability to convey the cultural and linguistic nuances of the original text. The translation made Pawar's story accessible to a wider international audience, contributing to global conversations about caste, feminism, and human rights. The autobiography is now a key text in academic courses on South Asian studies, women's studies, and world literature.

=== Awards ===
Aaydan received several major awards: Maharashtra Foundation, USA; Priyadarshini Academy; Padmashri Vikhe Patil; and the Matoshree Bheemabai Ambedkar Award.
