= Dalit literature =

Anti-caste literary movement

Dalit literature is a genre of Indian writing that focuses on the lives, experiences, and struggles of the Dalit community over centuries, in relation to the caste system and caste-based discrimination. This literary genre encompasses various Indian languages such as Bhojpuri, Marathi, Bangla, Hindi, Kannada, Punjabi, Sindhi, Odia and Tamil and includes narrative-styles like poems, short stories, and autobiographies. The movement started gaining influence during the mid-twentieth-century in independent India and has since spread across various Indian languages.

In the colonial and post-colonial period, Jyotirao Phule's Gulamgiri, published in 1873, became a seminal work describing the plight of the Untouchables in India. Authors such as Sharankumar Limbale, Namdeo Dhasal, and Bama, and movements like the Dalit Panther movement in Maharashtra as well as Dr. B.R. Ambedkar, a jurist, economist and social reformer, have played influential roles in shaping Dalit literature across India.

Dalit feminist writing such as the autobiographies and testimonios of Dalit women authors emphasizing the intersection of caste, class, and gender in the context of social exclusion came through this movement. Dalit women authors, such as Urmila Pawar and Baby Kamble, have written extensively about the complexities of caste, class, and gender in Indian society.

== Early Dalit literature ==
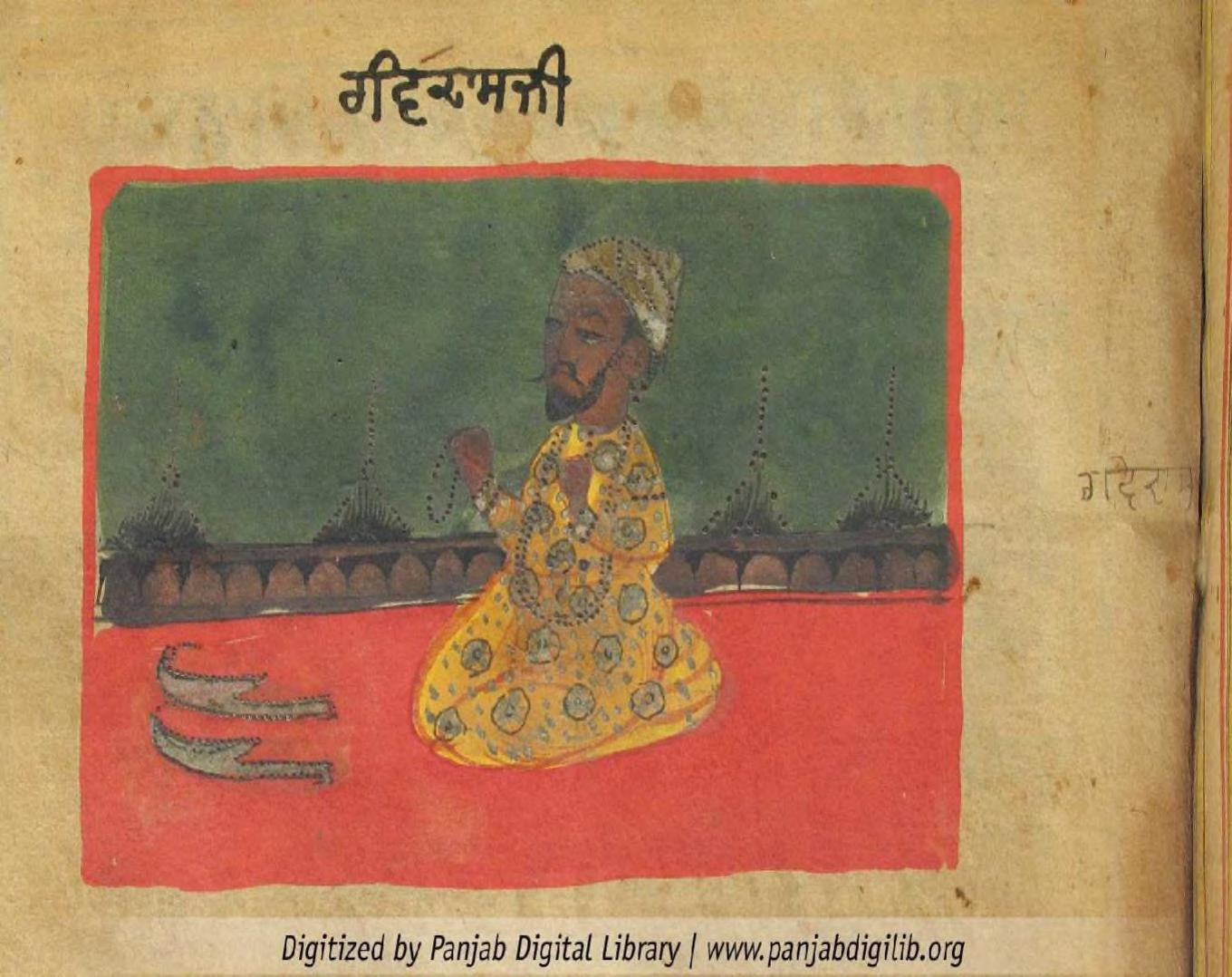
Painting of Guru Ravidas (18th century)

One of the first Dalit writers was Madara Chennaiah, an 11th-century cobbler-saint who lived during the reign of the Western Chalukyas and who is also regarded by some scholars as the "father of Vachana poetry." Another poet from the same Jangam order was Dohara Kakkayya whose six confessional poems survive. Chokhamela, initiated into the bhakti movement by the poet-saint Namdev, sang several songs in the abhang style during the 14th century. Ravidas (15th-16th century) was also a renowned spiritual leader in the bhakti tradition who came from leather-working caste. Other Marathi Bhakti poets such as Gora, and Karmamela, and the Tamil Siddhas, or Chittars are also suggested to have been Dalits.

The Panchasakha poets—Balarama Dasa, Jagannatha Dasa, Achyutanda Dasa, Jasobanta Dasa, and Ananta Dasa—were influential in Odia literature from 1450 to 1550 AD. They wrote in the vernacular in Odia literature which helped establish colloquial Odia's use in literature, representing a departure from Sanskrit-dominated literary traditions. Their contributions include translations of sacred Hindu texts into accessible language, such as Jagmohan Ramayan, Odia Bhagabata, Harivamsa, Premabhakti Brahmagita, and Hetudaya Bhagabata. Sudramuni Sarala Dasa is noted as a pioneer of the social protest movement in Odisha during the fifteenth century. A Sudra by caste, he depicted the experiences of the marginalised through works written in the vernacular language. His major works, the Odia Mahabharata, the Bilanka Ramayana, and Chandi Purana focused on contemporary issues and everyday experiences and directly critiqued the dominance of Sanskrit in literature and royalty as subjects of such literature.

Telugu Dalit literature has a history dating back to the 17th century, featuring poets such as Potuluri Veerabrahmam and Yogi Vemana, who wrote about the injustice of social hierarchies relating to caste and untouchability.

== Modern Dalit literature ==
The body of modern Dalit literature, which encompasses a growing collection of work, is largely rooted in developments from the late 1960s onward. Nevertheless, its origins can be traced to the early 19th century. Muktabai Salve, who is sometimes described as "the first Dalit feminist writer", wrote an essay in 1855, at the age of fourteen, titled Mang Maharachya Dukhavishayi (lit. 'Grief of Mang-Mahars'), published in the Marathi periodical Dnyanodaya (lit. 'Rise of Knowledge'). Scholar Hanumant Ajinath Lokhande writes that "the genealogy of Dalit literature can be traced in Salve's essay." Modern Dalit writing only emerged as a distinct genre following reformist thinkers and writers such as Narayana Guru, Jyotirao Phule, B.R. Ambedkar, Iyothee Thass, Sahodaran Ayyappan, Ayyankali, Poykayil Appachan, among others.

According to scholars Satyanarayana and Tharu, Dalit literature gained traction when the Dalit Panthers movement revitalized and extended the ideas of Ambedkar, critiquing Indian nationalism's Gandhian perspective and launching a new social movement centred on Dalit rights and political mobilisation. Over subsequent decades, Dalit writing evolved into a nationwide phenomenon, reformulating the issue of caste and reassessing the impacts of colonialism and missionary activity. Tatyanarayana and Tharu note that these works vividly illustrate and analyze the persistent workings of caste power in contemporary India Dalit author Sharankumar Limbale characterizes Dalit literature as a medium for expressing the grief inherent in Dalit lives, documenting experiences of discrimination, poverty, and social exclusion faced by Dalit communities. Jaydeep Sarangi, in his 2018 introduction to Dalit Voice, writes that Dalit literature is a culture-specific upheaval in India giving importance to Dalit realization, aesthetics and resistance.

The movement can be traced back to the publication of Gulamgiri by Jyotirao Phule in 1873, which is considered an early influential work that addressed the experiences of Dalits. Notable contributors to Modern Dalit literature include Mahasweta Devi, Arjun Dangle, Sachi Rautray, Rabi Singh, Basudev Sunani, Bama, Abhimani, Poomani, Imayam, Marku, Mangal Rathod, Neerav Patel, Perumal Murugan, Palamalai, Yendluri Sudhakar, and D. Gopi.

In recent years, new voices in Dalit literature have emerged, broadening the scope and impact of this genre. Among these are P. Sivakami, whose work The Grip of Change is noted for its depiction of Dalit life, and Vijila Chirrappad, a writer from Kerala who addresses the challenges facing Dalit women. Dev Kumar, founder of Apna Theatre in 1992, has used drama to promote Dalit consciousness, while Tamil Nadu-based Meena Kandasamy combines feminist and anti-caste themes to highlight the intersections of gender and caste discrimination.

The first Dalit literature conference, Dalit Sahitya Sammelan, was held in 1958 organised by Annabhau Sathe. He was a communist, who turned to Ambedkarite movement in the later part of his life. Scholars have described this gathering as significant in the establishment of Dalit literature as a distinct literary genre.

== Regional literature ==
=== Dalit literature in Marathi ===
Dalit literature in the modern era emerged in the Marathi language as a literary movement as a precursor to its flourishing in various Indian languages. The formation of a distinct literary culture can be traced to the formation of Anarya Dosh Pariharak Mandal in 1890 started by Gopal Baba Walangkar, a retired British army officials from the Mahar and Chambar communities. Gopal Baba Valangkar, a close associate of Phule, started his main body of literary work post his retirement from the British Army. Contemporary poet Kondaji Ramji or Pandit Kondiram, had written on the inhumane conditions imposed on the Mahars. Kondiram's poetry made distinctions between Hinduism dictated by the Manusmriti's Brahmanic laws and the Bhakti movement as a path to spiritual enlightenment.

In 1958, the term "Dalit literature" was used at the first conference of Maharashtra Dalit Sahitya Sangha (Maharashtra Dalit Literature Society) in Mumbai - "The only demand Dalits have is that the contemporary literature should represent their issues. It is not wrong to expect to be seen as we are". Notable Dalit authors writing in Marathi include Arun Kamble, Shantabai Kamble, Raja Dhale, Namdev Dhasal, Daya Pawar, Annabhau Sathe, Laxman Mane, Laxman Gaikwad, Sharankumar Limbale, Bhau Panchbhai, Kishor Shantabai Kale, Narendra Jadhav, Shankar Rao Kharat, and Urmila Pawar.

Baburao Bagul's first collection of stories, Jevha Mi Jat Chorali (English: When I Hid My Caste), published in 1963, depicted the societal cruelty experienced by Dalits and thus brought in a new momentum to Dalit literature in Marathi. Actor-director Vinay Apte later adapted it into a film, contributing further to its cultural impact. Namdeo Dhasal, who founded Dalit Panther and its members wrote works that amplified the genre's impact on Marathi literature.

Shankarrao Kharat served as president of the 1984 session of Marathi Sahitya Sammelan (Marathi literary conference) held in Jalgaon highlighting the increasing acceptance of Dalit voices in mainstream Marathi literary forums. Dalit literature started being mainstream in India with the appearance of the English translations of Marathi Dalit writing. An Anthology of Dalit Literature, edited by Mulk Raj Anand and Eleanor Zelliot, and Poisoned Bread: Translations from Modern Marathi Dalit Literature, originally published in three volumes and later collected in a single volume, edited by Arjun Dangle and published in 1992. 'Poisoned Bread' - the collection takes its name from a story by Bandhu Madhav about Yetalya Aja, a Mahar who is forced to consume stale bread covered in dung and urine and dies as a result. Before he dies, Aja tells his grandson to get an education and take away the accursed bread from the mouths of Mahars.

In 1993, Ambedkari Sahitya Parishad organized the first Akhil Bharatiya Ambedkari Sahitya Sammelan (All India Ambedkarite Literature Convention) in Wardha, Maharashtra to re-conceptualize and transform Dalit literature into Ambedkari Sahitya, named after the Dalit modern-age hero, advocate and scholar B.R. Ambedkar. Ambedkari Sahitya Parishad then successfully organized the Third Akhil Bharatiya Ambedkari Sahitya Sammelan in 1996 and became a voice of advocacy for awareness and transformation.

=== Dalit literature in Bengali ===
In Bengali literature, the term "charal," derived from the Sanskrit word "chandal," serves as an umbrella term for Scheduled Castes, and the literature emerging from this context is often referred to as "Charal literature." This genre reflects the experiences and struggles of marginalized communities in Bengal. Notable examples of Charal literature include Jatin Bala's Sekor Chhera Jibon (An Uprooted Life) and Samaj Chetanar Galpa (Stories of Social Awakening) and Kalyani Charal's Chandalinir Kobita. The development of Dalit literature in Bengal was significantly influenced by the leadership of Harichand Thakur, a prominent figure in the Motua community, and the ideas of Dr. B.R. Ambedkar.

Scholars like Sekhar Bandyopadhyay in The Namasudra Movement and Sumit Sarkar in Writing Social History highlight the influence of the Motua community in developing caste consciousness and anti-caste movements in colonial Bengal. The Motua faith developed as an ideological opposition to Brahmanical Hindu practices in East Bengal and has since expanded to include various marginalized lower castes. Themes in Charal literature address a variety of issues, including the role of women in Motua religious teachings, the work ethic promoted by Harichand Thakur, and the relevance of Harichand's teachings to the Namasudra uprisings. Additionally, these writings explore the relationship between Motua dharma and the works of B.R. Ambedkar. According to Bandyopadhyay, Motua songs convey messages aimed at enhancing the self-confidence and collective identity of the oppressed community.

The Dalit Panther movement in Maharashtra led by influential figures such as Namdeo Dhasal has also inspired the Dalit literary movement in Bengal. This movement produced literature that starkly contrasts with the prevailing literary trends in Bengal, which often focused on romanticism and nationalism while neglecting pressing social issues. The autobiography of Dalit proletariat author Manoranjan Byapari, Itibritte Chandal Jiban, has garnered critical acclaim, further elevating the visibility and popularity of Dalit literature in Bengal. Other active Dalit journals in the region include Adhikar, Dalit Mirror, Nikhil Bharat, and Neer.

The organized Dalit literary movement in Bengal began in 1992, following the death-by-suicide of Chuni Kotal, which sparked widespread protests. These events led to the formation of the Bangla Dalit Sahitya Sanstha and the launch of the magazine Chaturtha Duniya. Chaturtha Duniya, which translates to "Fourth World," refers to the world of the fourth varna of the caste system while articulating the experiences of living in a world within the third world. This magazine has been instrumental in highlighting the works of significant Dalit writers in Bengal, including Manohar Mouli Biswas, Jatin Bala, Kapil Krishna Thakur, Kalyani Charal, Manju Bala, and others.

=== Dalit literature in Tamil ===
Dalit literature in Tamil Nadu has a significant historical context, emerging prominently in the late 19th century through the efforts of educated members of the Parayar community, a Scheduled Caste in Tamil Nadu, in the late 19th century. Iyothee Thass Pandithar, a prominent leader, advocated for a casteless Tamil society drawing on his interpretations of ancient Tamil history. His re-readings of ancient Tamil history spread ideas of socialism, rationality, and modernity in colonial India. He also protested against Manudharmic Brahminism and fought for the dignity and rights of the "untouchable communities," urging them to identify themselves as Panchamars (fifth Caste).

Dalit intellectuals regularly published journals like Oru Paisa Tamizhan, Parayan, Adi Dravidan, and Vazhikattovone in the early decades of the 20th century, providing a space to discuss and denounce Brahminical ideals and notions of Swadeshi ideals. These journals played a pivotal role in fostering awareness of Adi Dravida politics and identity. Adi Dravida leaders appreciated the zeal and social commitment of the Self-respect movement and urged Adi Dravidas to support it.

The 1940s witnessed a rise in communist movements in Tamil Nadu, which was very influential for Adi Dravida writers and proponents. Prominent Dalit writers, such as Daniel Selvaraj and Poomani, engaged with Marxist ideologies, reflecting the economic struggles faced by their community in their literary works. This era marked the early development of Tamil Dalit literature, characterized by novels and short stories authored by Adi Dravida writers.

The late 1980s and early 1990s were pivotal for the Tamil Dalit literary movement. Writers began addressing issues related to caste discrimination, social injustice, and economic inequalities. However, it was in the 1990s that the Tamil Dalit literary movement gained momentum. The release of the Mandal Commission report in the 1990s catalyzed communal tensions and heightened Dalit awareness, prompting the formation of a distinct caste identity. Additionally, the centenary celebrations of B.R. Ambedkar in 1992 revitalized interest in his principles and ideas among Tamil Dalits.

The annual Dalit cultural festival, organized by the Dalit Athara Maiyam, articulated issues and problems related to Dalits. Dalit cultural festivals were conducted in Pondicherry and Neyveli in 1992. The influence of the little magazine movement, which gained traction in India during the 1950s and 1960s, also impacted Tamil Dalit literature in the 1990s. This period witnessed a spurt of Dalit journals like Dalit Murasu, Kodangi (later renamed Pudiya Kodangi), Manusanga, Dalit, and Mallar Malar. Journals like Subamangala, Nirapirigai, Kavithasaran, Ilakku, Thinamani Kathir, and Sathangai published special issues focusing on Dalit literature, contributing significantly to its growth and recognition. Over the next decade, the production of Dalit literature and the arts flourished. Writers such as Sivakami, Edayavendan, Unjai Rajan Abimani, Bama, Anbadavan, K. A. Gunasekaran, Imaiyam emerged during this time, significantly contributing to the genre. Notable works include Sivakami's "Pazhiyana Kazhidalum" (The Grip of Change) and Bama's "Karukku," noted as the first Dalit novel in Tamil written by a woman.

=== Dalit literature in Punjabi ===
Dalit literature in Punjab has a significant tradition characterized by the contributions of various poets throughout history. The origins of this literary tradition can be traced back to Bhai Jaita (1657–1704), a devoted disciple of Guru Gobind Singh, who composed the devotional epic Sri Gur Katha. In the early nineteenth century, Sant-poet Sadhu Wazir Singh (1790–1859) became a notable figure, producing works that explored spiritual, social, and philosophical themes. Wazir Singh's writings challenged established Brahmanical structures and advocated for gender equality, promoting a vision of a society free from hierarchical constraints. Sadhu Daya Singh Arif (1894–1946), born into a landless untouchable Mazhabi Sikh family, overcame educational challenges to write poetic works, including "Zindagi Bilas" and "Sputtar Bilas".

Others such as Giani Ditt Singh played a crucial role in the Singh Sabha movement which advocated a return to true Sikhism as a counter to proselytizing by Christian missionaries and organisations like the Arya Samaj. As the editor of the Khalsa Akhbar, he significantly contributed to Sikh intellectualism. Ditt Singh's works covered a wide range of subjects, from love-lore and Sikh traditions to history and ethics, often critiquing popular religious practices rooted in what he considered "superstitious beliefs.

=== Dalit literature in Telugu ===
Following India's independence, a new generation of Dalit poets, artists, and intellectuals emerged, bringing literary art into the public domain and supporting socio-political movements in Andhra Pradesh and Telangana. The Communist Party’s Jana Natya Mandali used oral storytelling and folk art to spread messages among Dalit communities. Various theatrical forms, including Burrakatha, Yakshaganam, Oggukatha and other street plays were used in activist movements. Prominent activist-singers, such as Gaddar, Masterji, Goreti Venkanna, Suddala Hanumanthu, Bandi Yadagiri and Guda Anjanna, Mittapelli Surender and Andesri, used their songs to advocate for revolution, eventually making their way into the mainstream Telugu industry.

Following the Karamchedu massacre in 1985, there was increased attention to issues of caste discrimination and catalysed a greater solidarity among Dalit activists and communities. This event also united two influential Dalit intellectuals, Kathi Padma Rao and Bojja Tarakam, who assumed leadership roles within the Dalit Mahasabha in 1987, making it an influential advocacy organisation. Many Dalit poetry anthologies were also published during this period, including "Padunekkina Pata" and "Chikkanaina Pata", alongside contributions from women writers such as Gogu Shyamala, Joopaka Subhadra, Jajula Gowri, and Challapalli Swaroopa Rani.

=== Dalit literature in Gujarati ===
Dalit literature in Gujarati began to gain momentum in the mid-1970s with the launch of Puma, a literary magazine edited by Rameshchandra Parmar. This was followed by the publication of several other magazines such as Akrosh, KaloSooraj, Garud, Dalit Bandhu, NayaMarg, and Disa. In 1975, a group of youths in Ahmedabad started publishing a magazine called Panther, inspired by the Dalit Panthers. The movement gained momentum during the state of emergency imposed by Prime Minister Indira Gandhi in 1975 and the anti-reservation agitations in 1981 and 1985. The first collection of Gujarati Dalit poetry appeared in a magazine in 1978, featuring contributions from writers such as Neerav Patel, Dalpat Chauhan, Pravin Gadhvi, and Yogesh Dave. Ganpat Parmar and Manishi Jani later published the first comprehensive collection of Gujarati Dalit literature. In 1981, the first collection of Dalit poetry, Dalit Kavita, edited by Ganpat Parmar and Manishi Jani, was published. Another collection called Visphot, edited by Balkrishna Anand and Chandu Maheria, was published in 1983. Asmita, a collection of poems published in the Dalit periodical Nayamarg between 1981 and 1983, was published by the Gujarat Khet Vikas Parishad in 1983.

Other notable writers in this genre include Sahil Parmar, Joseph Macwan, Harish Mangalam, Pathik Parmar, Mohan Parmar, Madhukantkalpit, and B.N. Vankar. Joseph Macwan was the first Gujarati Dalit writer to receive a Sahitya Akademi award. Macwan's novel Angliyat is regarded as a seminal piece Gujarati literature, depicting the lives and struggles of the Vankar community.

=== Dalit literature in Odia ===
Notable writers include Basudeb Sunani, Samir Ranjan, Sanjay Bag, Pitambar Tarai, Ramesh Malik, Chandrakant Malik, Kumaramani Tanti, Supriya Malik, Basant Malik, Akhila Nayak, Anjubala Jena, Mohan Jena, Samuel Dani, Anand Mahanand, Panchanan Dalei, and Pravakar Palka.

In the nineteenth century, Bhima Bhoi, a Kondh tribal poet and follower of Mahima Dharma, continued the tradition of protest literature. His works, such as the Stuti Chintamani, the Srutinisedha Gita, and the Nirbeda Sadhana, criticized orthodox rituals and societal customs in Odisha. In 1953, Dalit Jati Sangha (Dalit League) was founded by Govinda Chandra Seth, Santanu Kumar Das, Jagannath Malik, Kanhu Malik, and Kanduri Malik and led to the creation of various literary works. Seth’s biography of B.R. Ambedkar and Das’s novels—Awhana, Vitamati, Sania, and Pheria—focused on themes of caste inequality and social injustice.

In the 1970s and 1980s, there was an emergence of Dalit voices in Odisha through literature. Bichitrananda Nayak is recognized as a significant figure in Odia Dalit writings, publishing Anirbana (Liberation) in 1972, which incorporated the term "Dalit" in various poems. Other notable writers and poets include Krushna Charan Behera. The Ambedkar centenary celebrations in 1991 inspired a larger number of Odia Dalit poets and writers to reflect on their histories and openly discuss issues of caste, class, and gender exploitation.

== Dalit autobiographies ==
In the 1960s and 1970s, Dalit autobiographies in India emerged as a powerful tool for social and political protest. Baluta, a groundbreaking autobiography by Dagdu Maruti Pawar that questioned the caste system and the social stigma associated with Dalit names, was one of the first and most impactful works. Many other Dalit writers followed suit, asserting their identity and protesting oppression through memoirs, poetry, and autobiographical fiction. Annabhau Sathe's autobiography Fakira (1972), Baburao Bagul's autobiographical novel Jevha Mi Jaat Chorli Hoti (1963), Babytai Kamble's Jina Amucha, Urmila Pawar's Aaydan, Shantabai Kamble's Majya Jalmachi Chittarkatha, Omprakash Valmiki's autobiographical poetry Joothan (1997), Siddalingaiah's Ooru Keri (1995), and Bama's Karukku (1992) are among the notable writers and works. Authors such as Narendra Jadhav, Loknath Yashwant, Kumar Anil, G.K. Ainapure, Avinash Gaikwad, and Santosh Padmakar Pawar write of their achievements, while Urmila Pawar, Sushama Deshpande, Ushakiran Atram, Ashalata Kamble, Sandhya Rangari, Kavita Morwankar, and Chayya Koregaonkar discuss the intersection of caste and gender.

=== Dalit women's autobiographies and testimonios ===
the testimonio is for a Dalit woman a powerful medium to protest against adversaries within and without

— Sharmila Rege, The Weave of My Life, Afterword. by Urmila Pawar, Translated by Maya Pandit (2008).

Dalit women's autobiographies and testimonios have significantly influenced Dalit literature by highlighting documenting experiences related to caste-based discrimination and social exclusion. These narratives emphasize the intersection of caste, class, and gender in the context of social exclusion. Prominent Dalit women authors, have brought attention to the struggles of their communities, contributing to the development of Dalit feminism and providing a foundation for understanding the complexities of caste, class, and gender in Indian society. Scholars like Sharmila Rege have argued that Dalit women's testimonios present alternative perspectives to mainstream historical narratives within both Dalit and women's movements and that these narratives can be understood as expressions of protest, resistance, and identity formation, asserting the subjectivity of marginalized individuals and communities.

Some prominent Dalit women authors and their works include:

- Karukku (1992) by Bama: This Tamil work, translated into English with the same title, highlights the issues of caste, class, and gender as important markers for social exclusion. Bama's writing has been praised for breaking taboos, challenging social conventions and representing the experiences of marginalized communities.
- Aaydan (The Weave of My Life: A Dalit Woman's Memoirs, 2003) by Urmila Pawar: Pawar compares her act of writing about her life with her mother's weaving of bamboo baskets, representing the suffering and agony of their experiences.
- Ratrandin Amha ('For Us – These Nights and Days', 1990) by Shantabai Dhanaji Dani: This testimonio recounts her participation in protests against British colonial authority, her arrest, and detainment in Yerwada jail in 1946. Dani was the secretary of the Nasik branch of Scheduled Caste Federation at the time, a significant accomplishment for a Dalit woman.
- Antasphot ('Thoughtful Outburst', 1981) by Kumud Pawade: Pawade emphasizes that her outburst is not emotional but analytical, examining the experiences of individuals and communities. She highlights the double exploitation faced by Dalit women in a culture based on hierarchy.
- Jinne Amuche ('Our Lives', 1986) by Baby Kondiba Kamble: Kamble's work underscores the inextricability of the individual and the collective in Dalit narratives by contextualizing her life against the backdrop of the five-decade history of the Mahar community.
- Deathly Pains (1992) by Janabai Kachru Girhe: As the first woman teacher and first woman of the Gopal community, a nomadic group, to write her testimony, Girhe offers insight into the lives of nomadic families and their experiences of hardship.
- Maajhi Me by Yashodara Gaikwad
- Mala Uddhvasta Vhaychay (I Want To Destroy Myself: A Memoir) by Malika Amar Shaik

=== Other examples of literary forms ===
- Dalit Hip-Hop
- Dalit Christian Hymns

== Mentioned authors ==
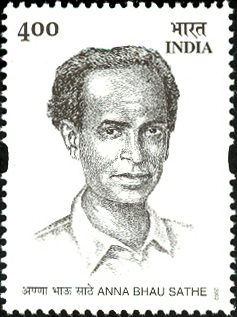
Annabhau Sathe

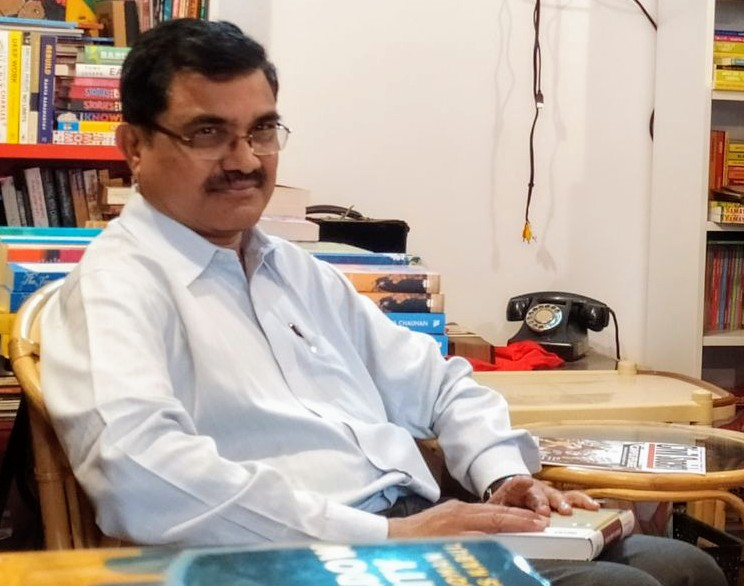
Anand Teltumbde

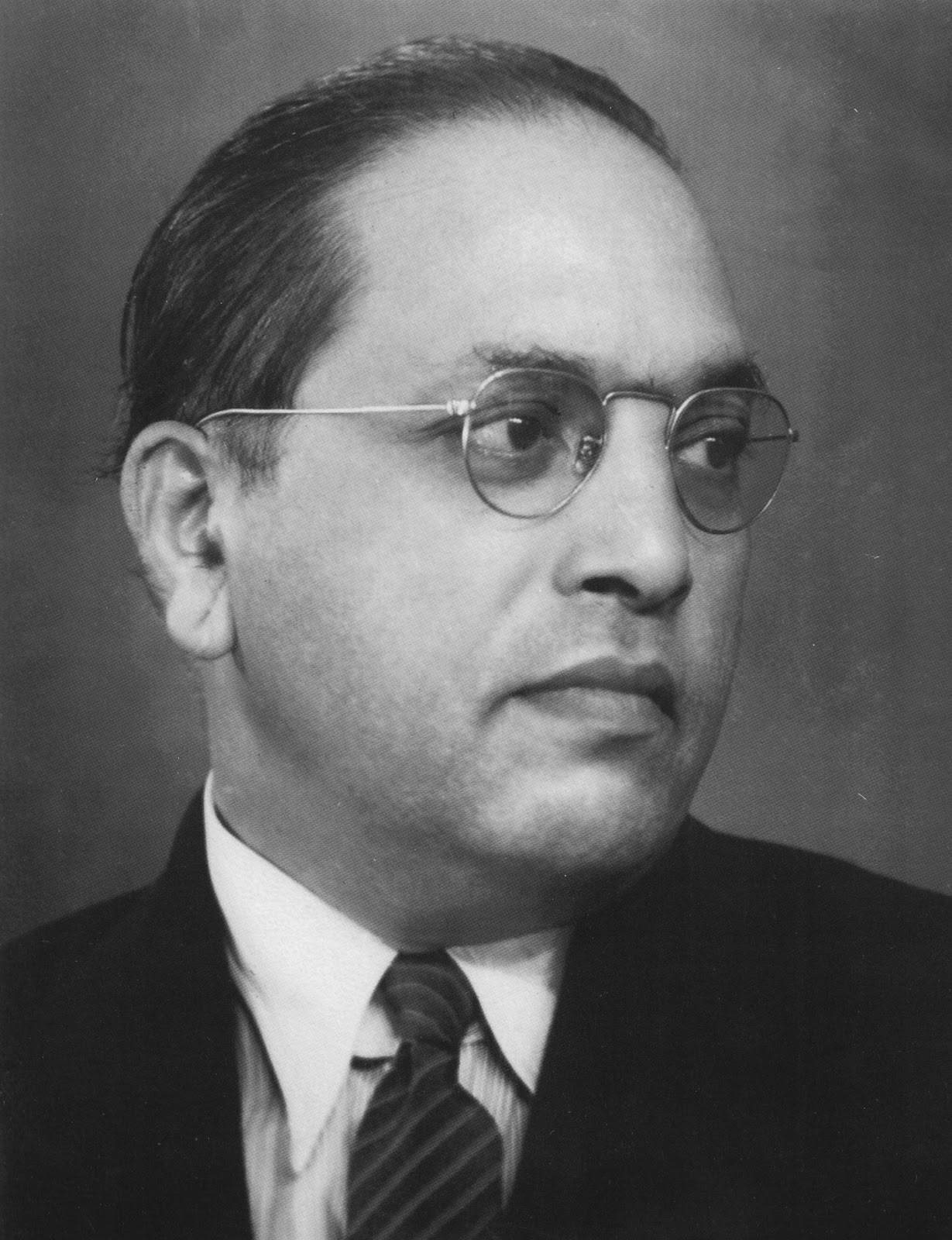
Dr. Bhimrao Ambedkar

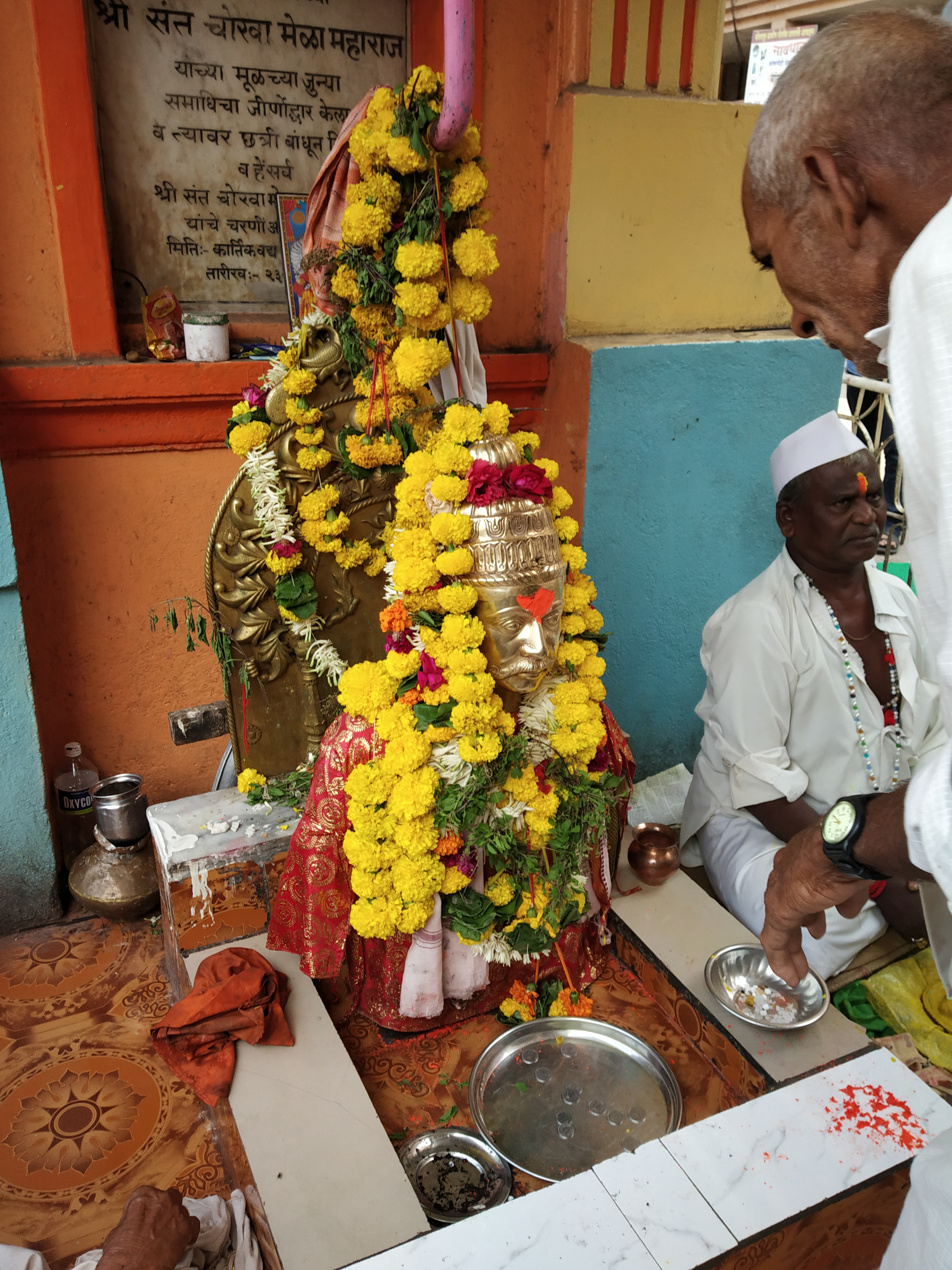
Chokhamela

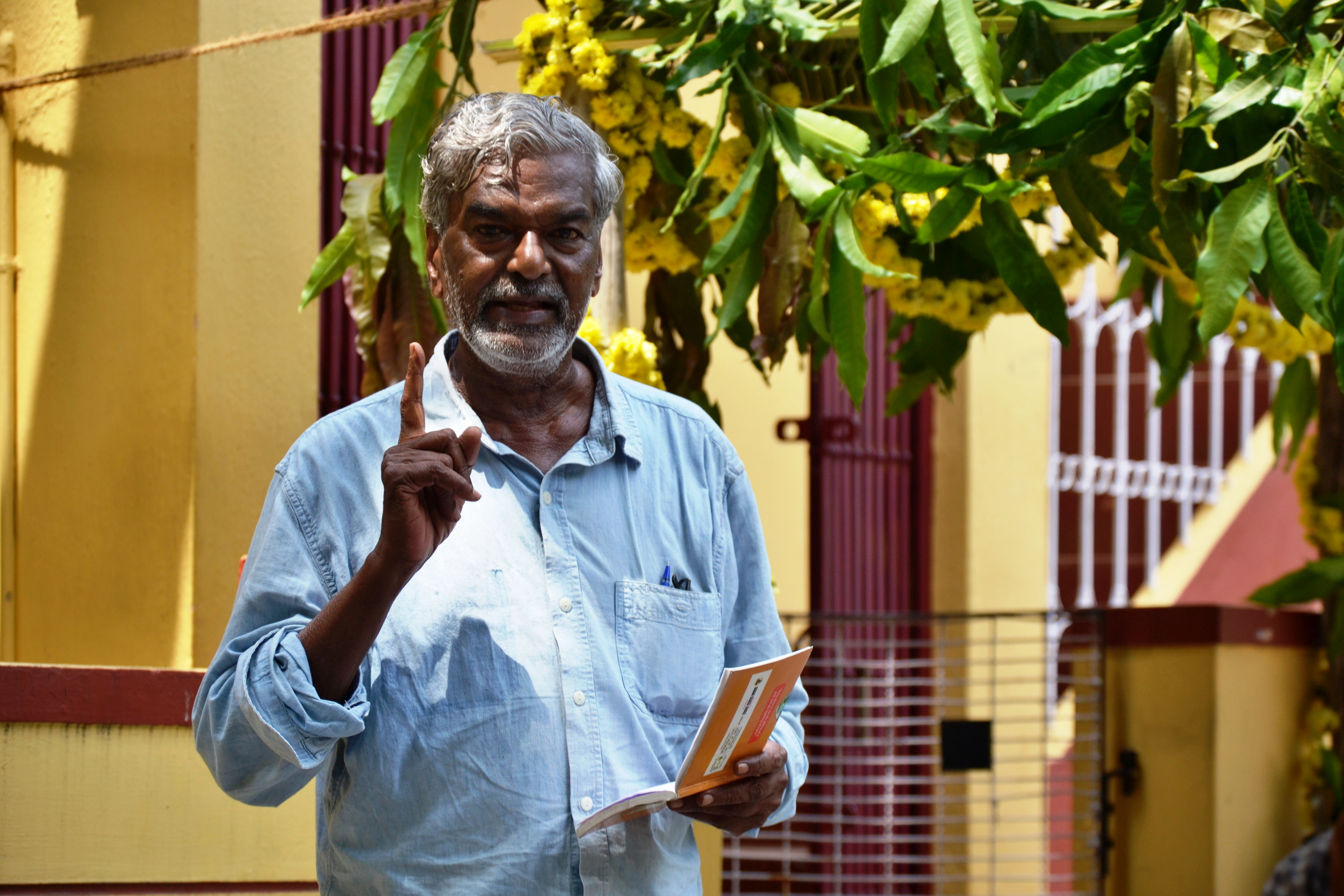
Devanur Mahadeva

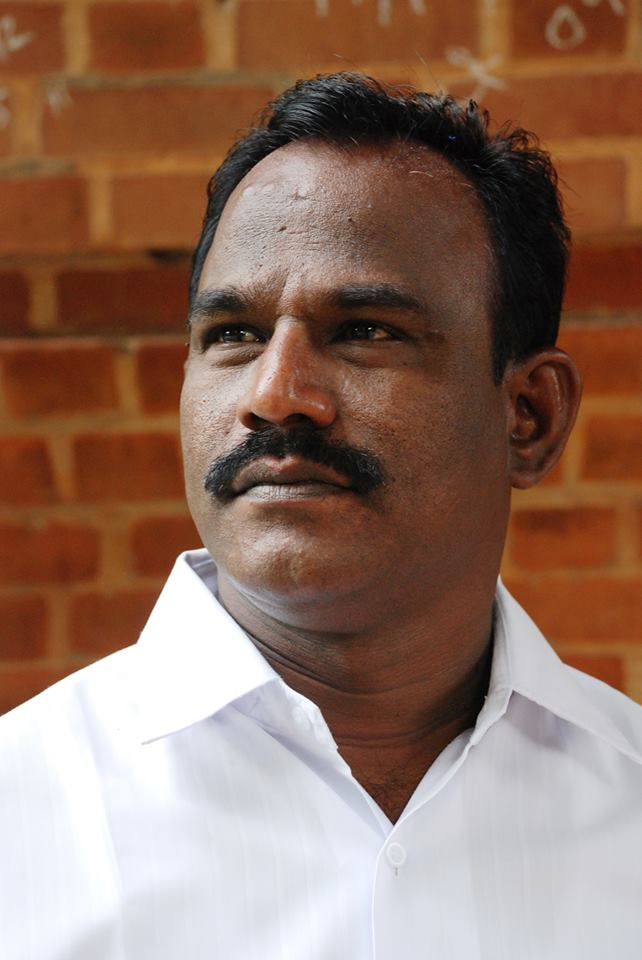
Imayam

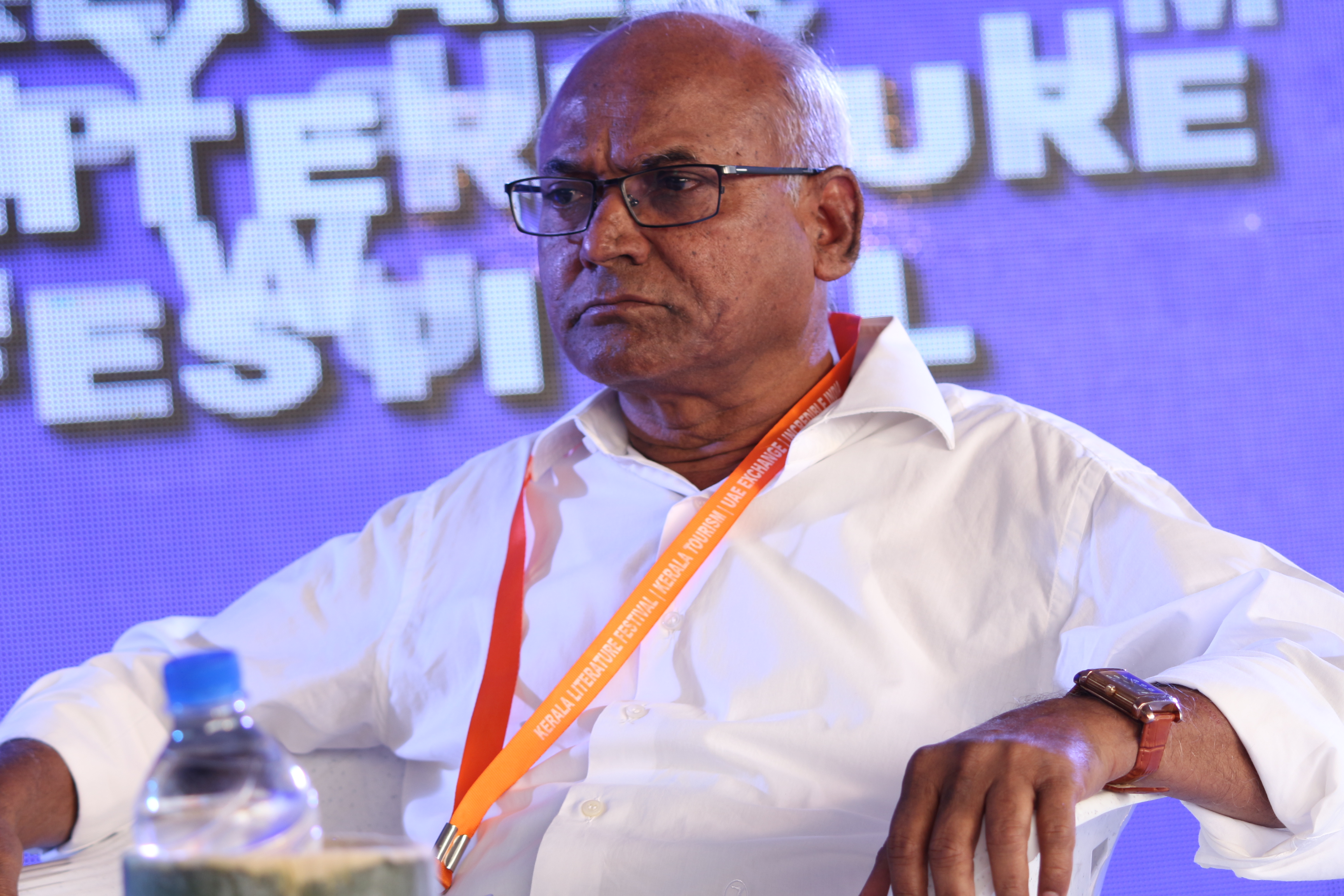
Kancha Ilaiah

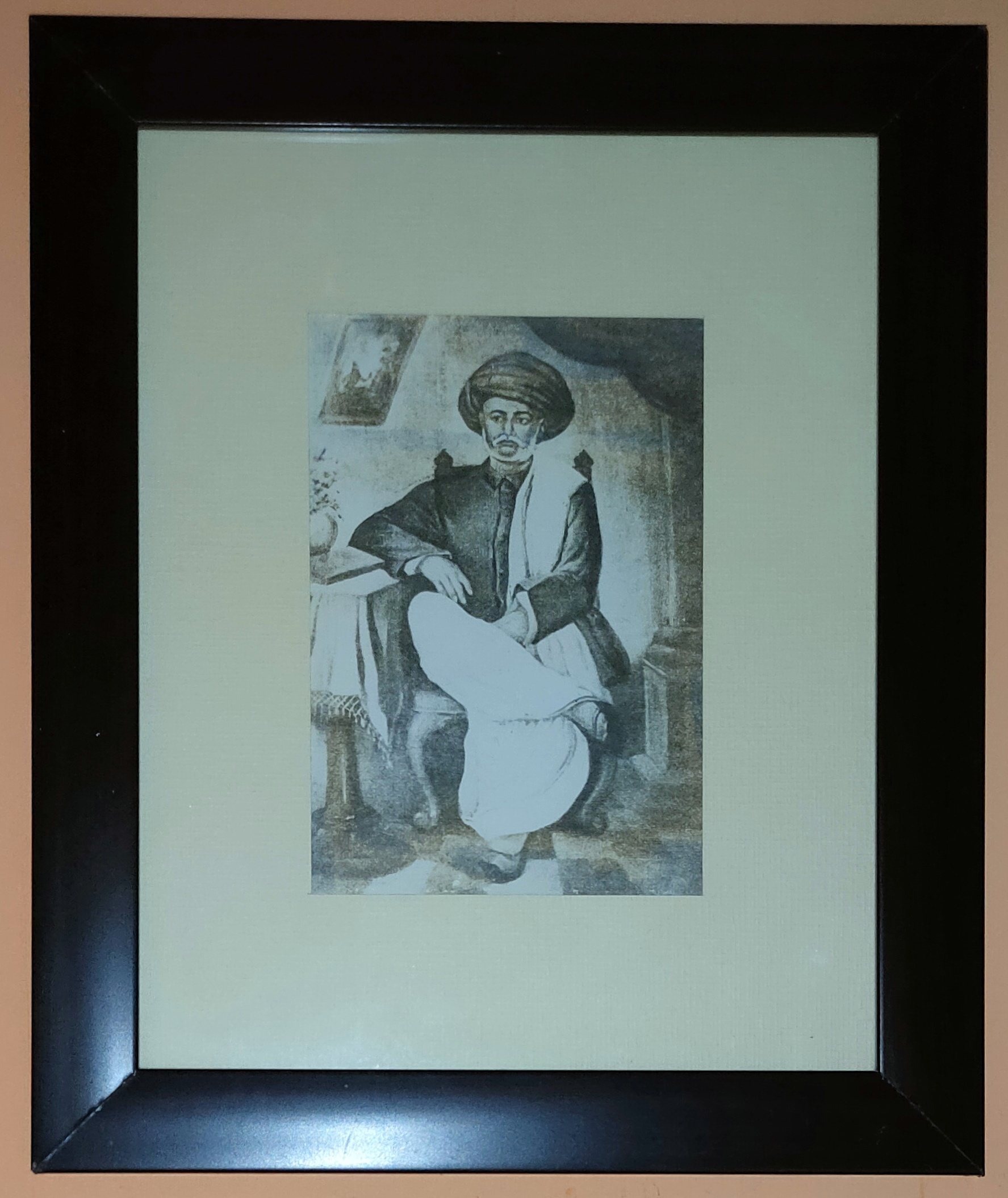
Mahatma Jyotiba Phule

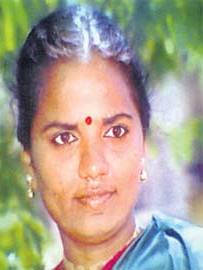
Joopaka Subhadra

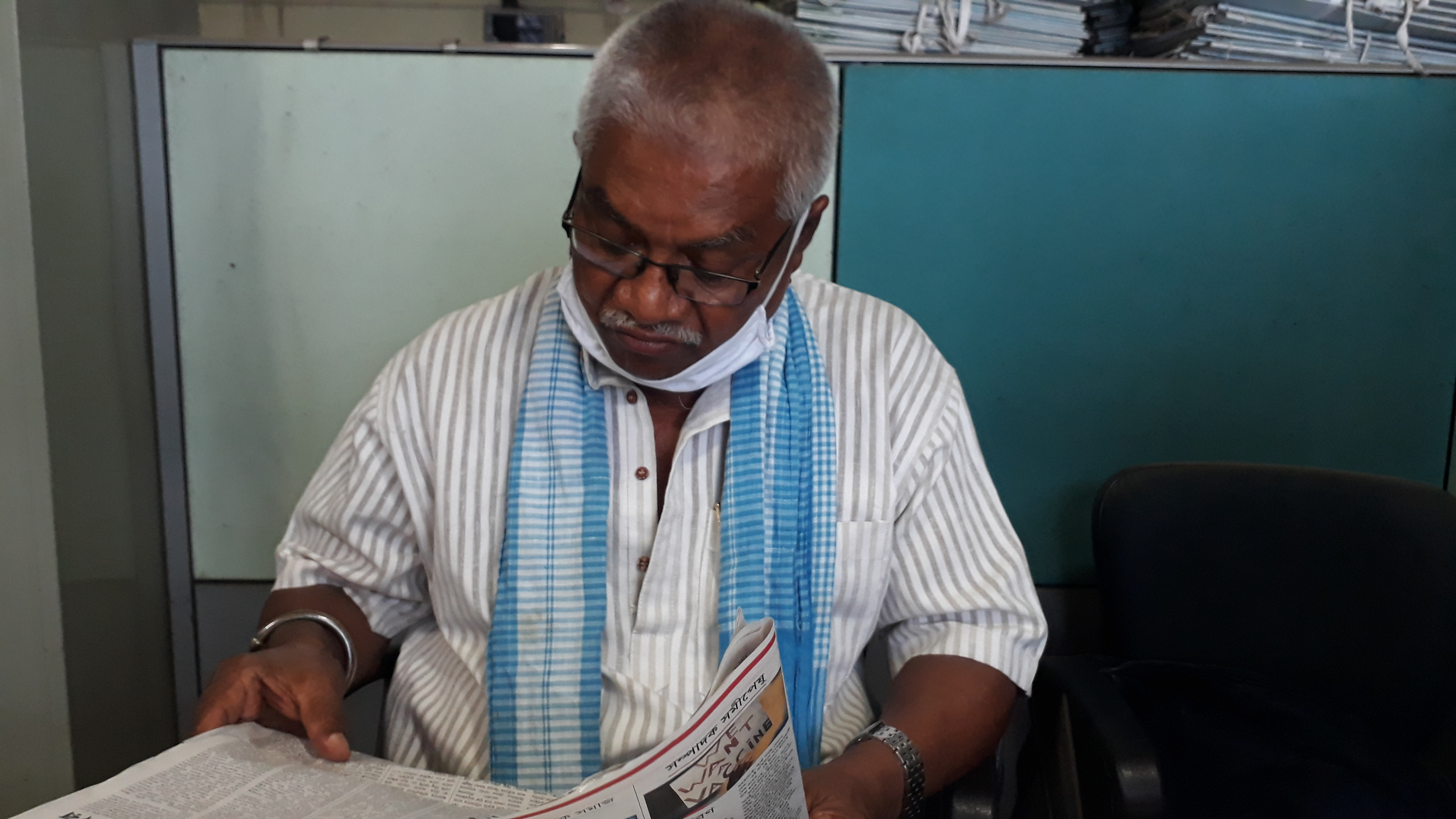
Monoranjan Bapari

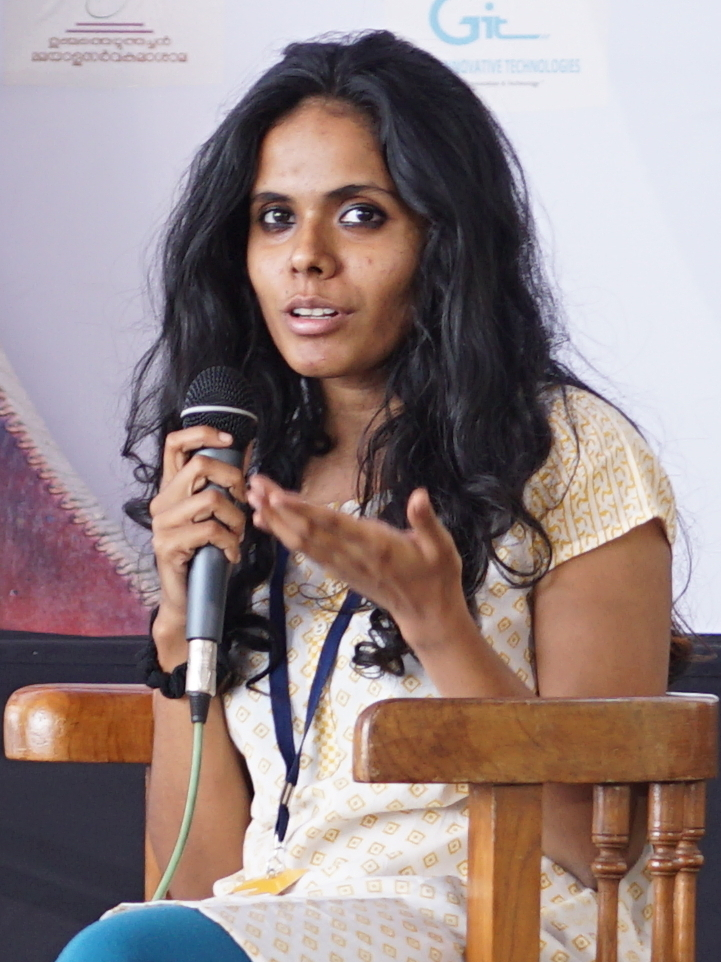
Meena Kandasamy

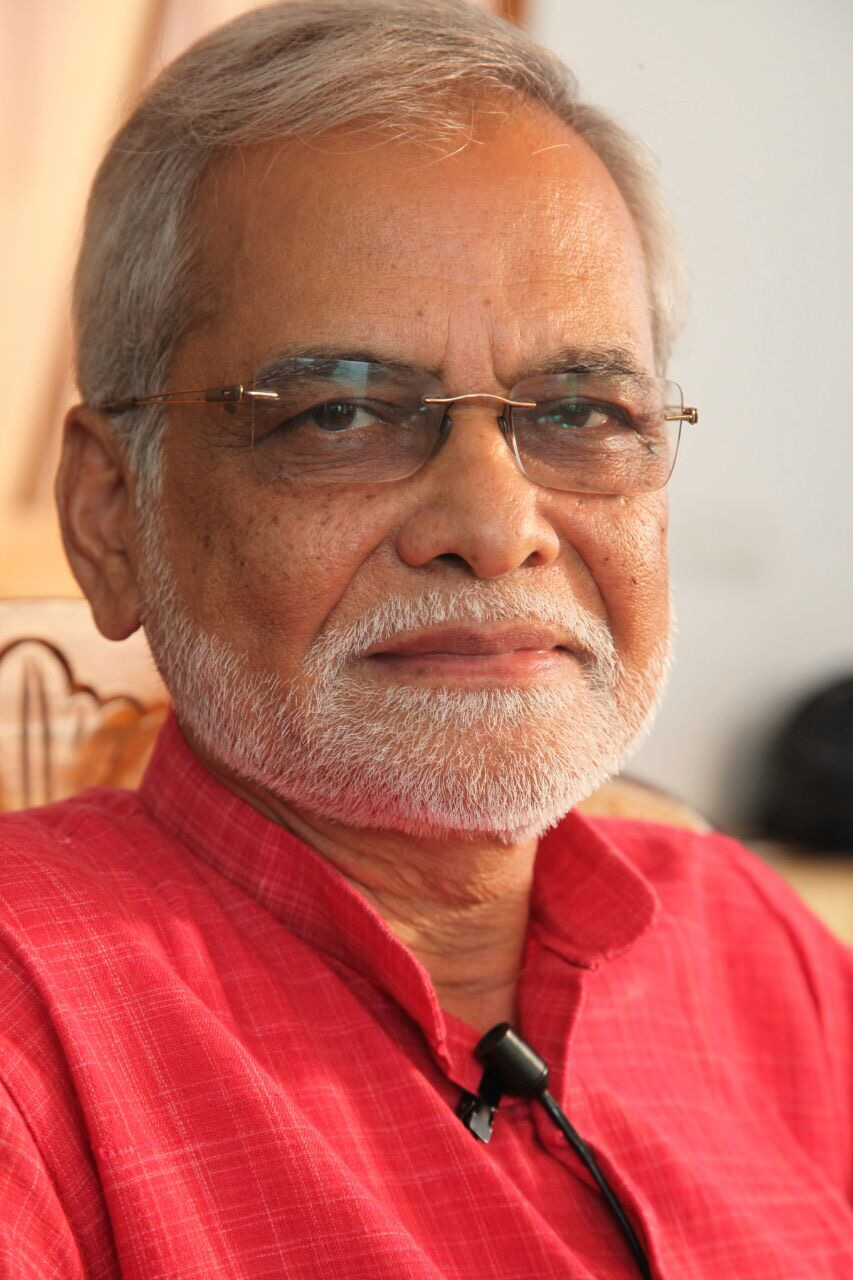
Mudnakudu Chinnaswamy

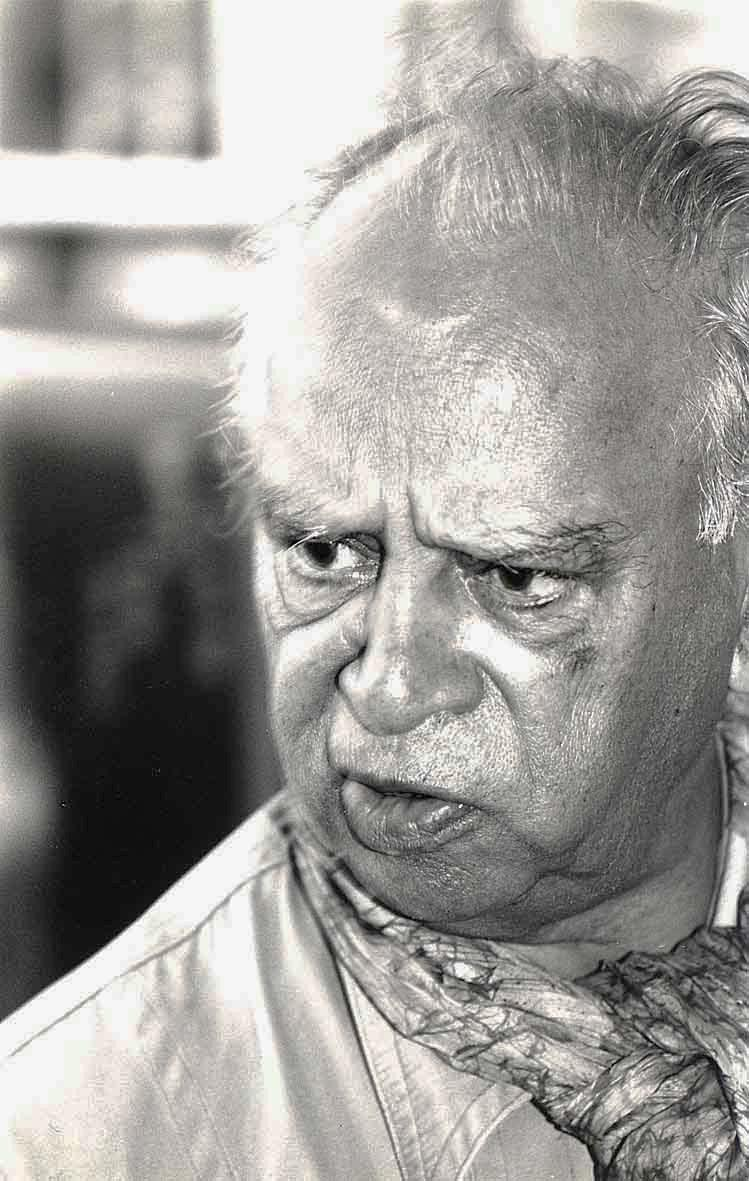
Mulk Raj Anand

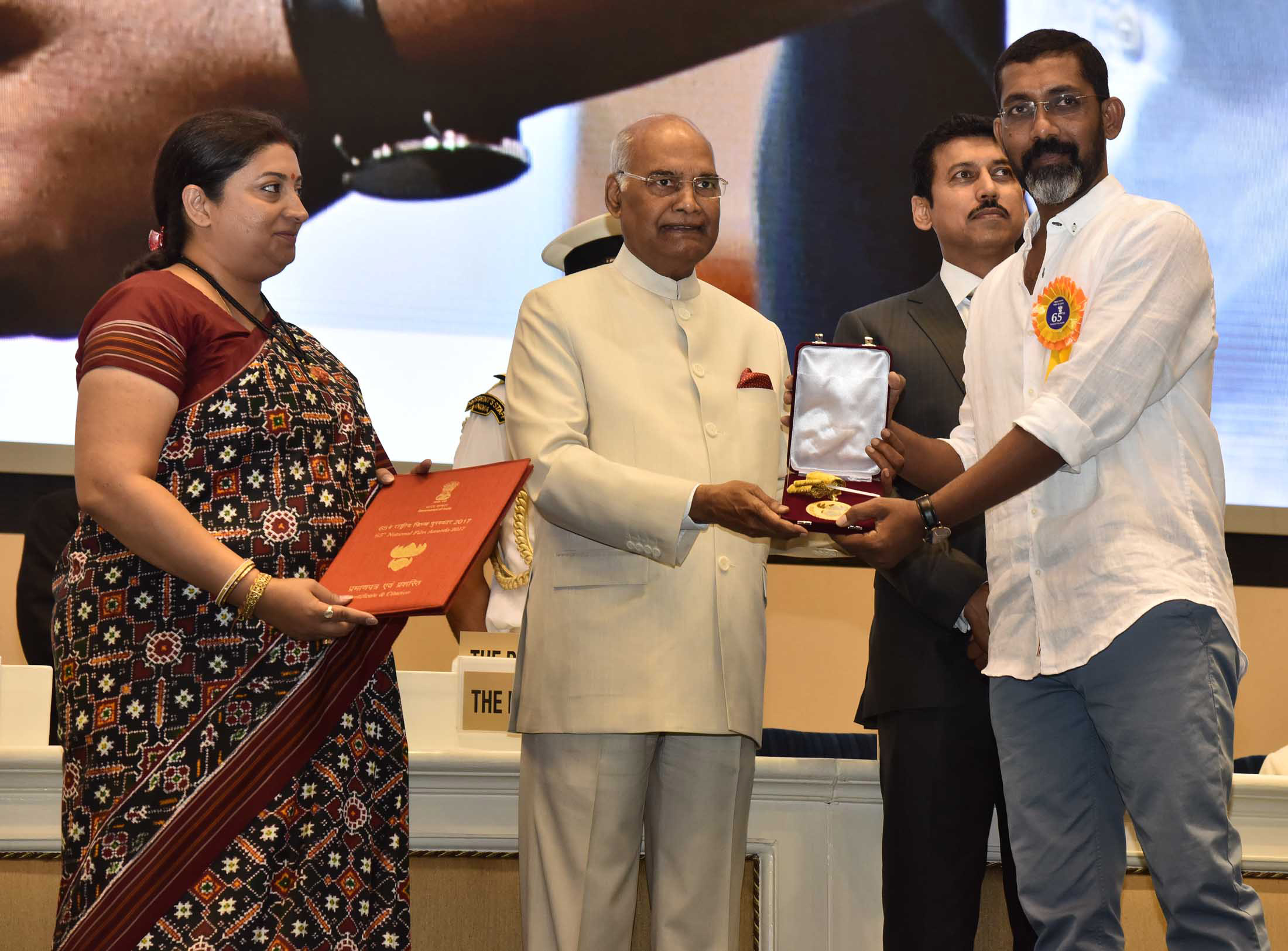
Shri Ram Nath Kovind presenting the Swarna Kamal Award to Nagraj Manjule

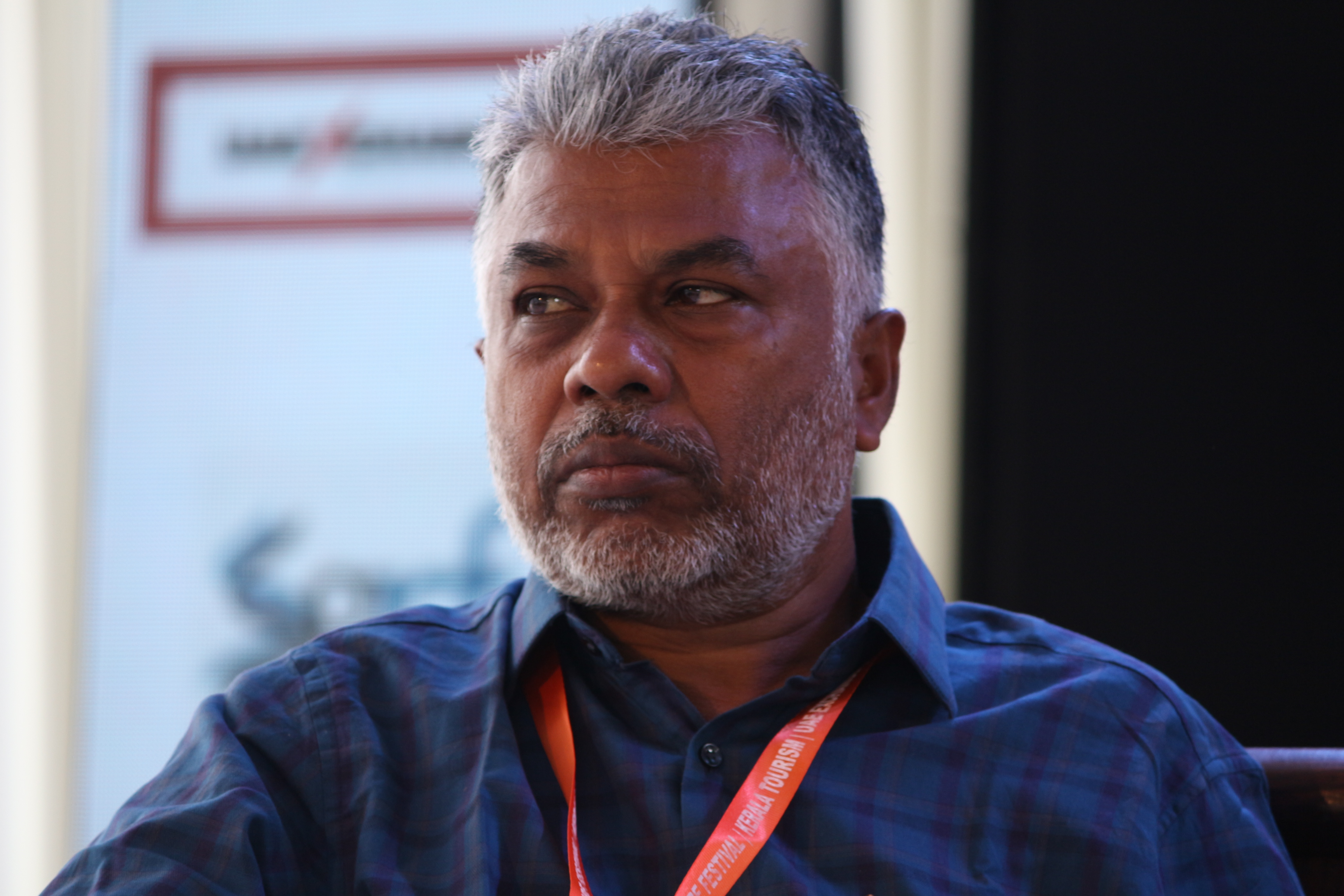
Perumal Murugan

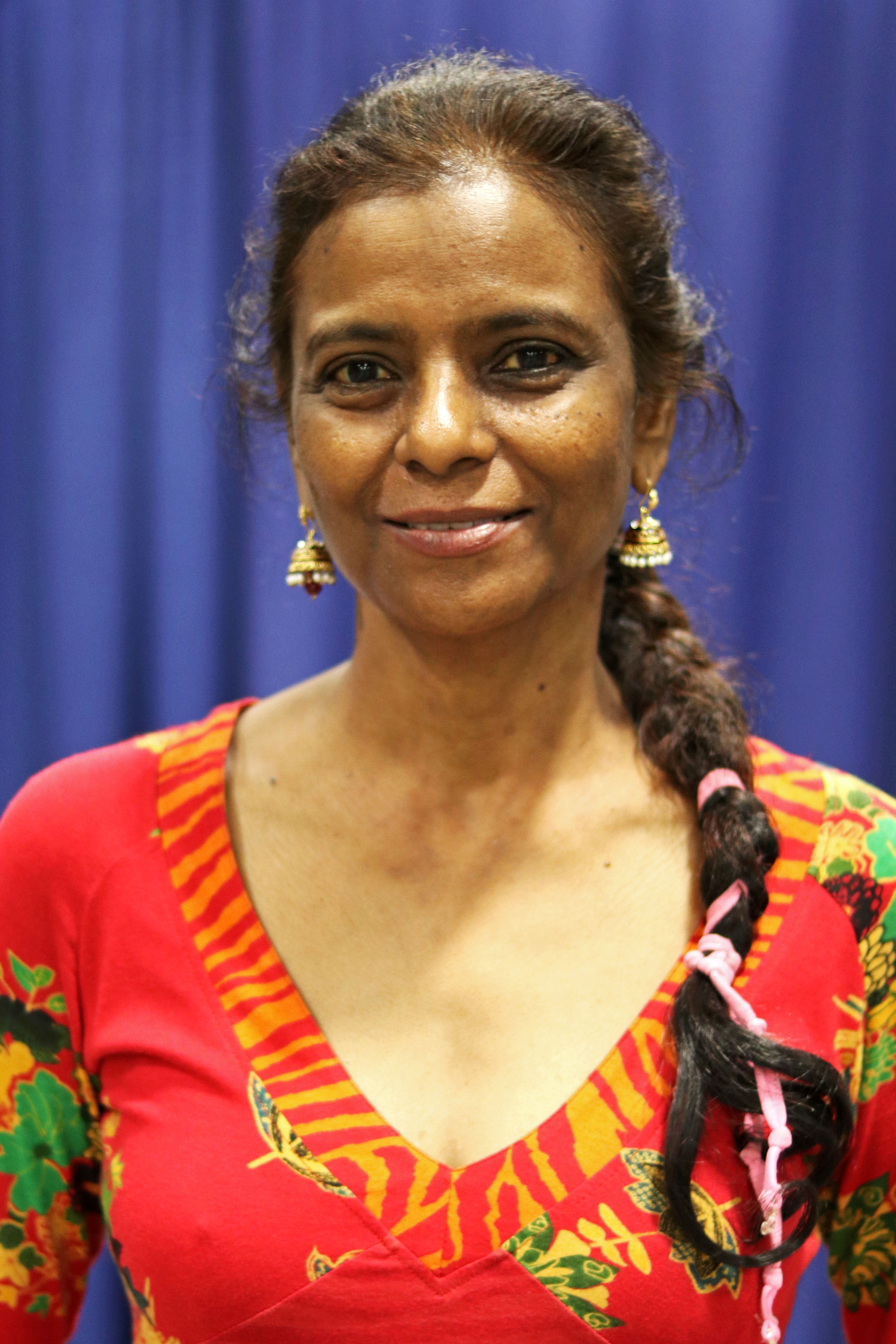
Sujatha Gidla

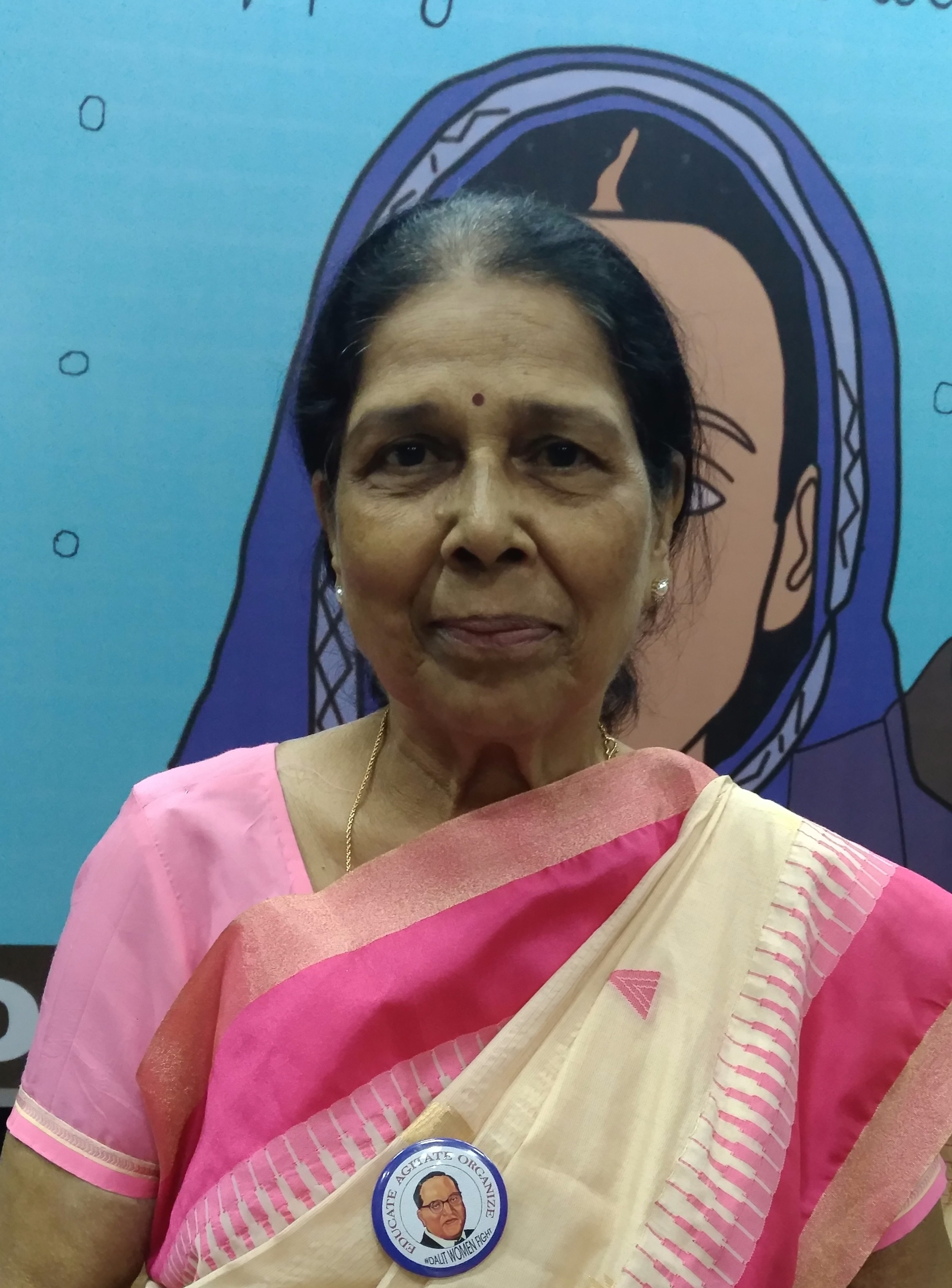
Urmila Pawar

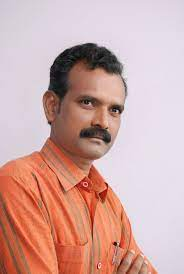
VEMULA YELLAIAH

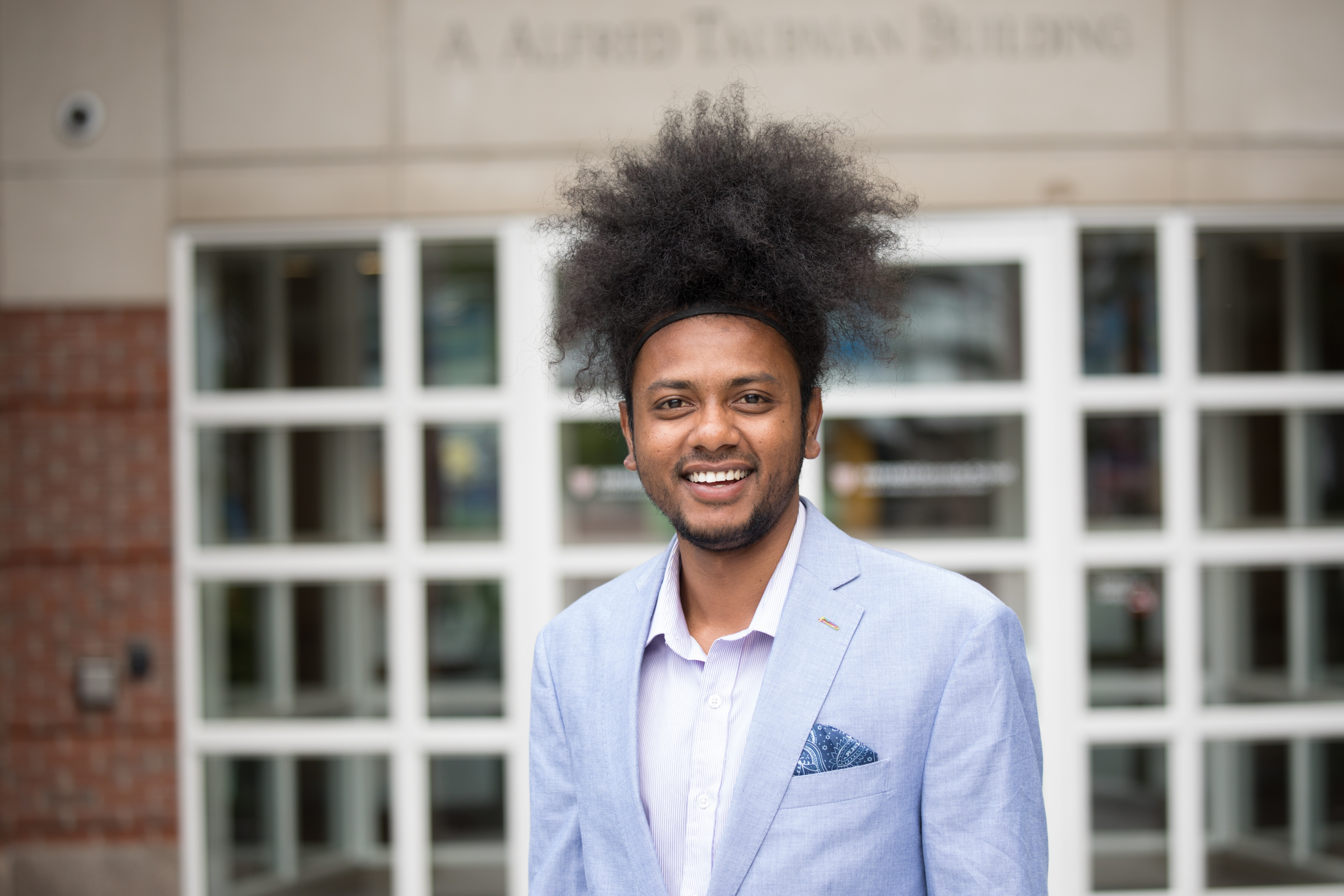
Dr. Suraj Yengde

== See also ==
- List of Dalit works
- Dalit studies
- Dalit music
