= Jatin Bala =

Bangladeshi Indian writer

- Born: 5 May 1949 (age 77); Jessore, Bangladesh erstwhile East Pakistan
- Occupations: Poet & Author

Jatin Bala is a Bengali Dalit author born in Parhiyali, Manirampur, Jessore, then part of East Pakistan, on 5 May 1949. Notably, his narrative titled "On Firm Ground" has been incorporated into the anthology "Survival and Other Stories: Bangla Dalit Fiction in Translation," published in 2012. He has produced an extensive body of work in the Bengali language, gaining renown for his exploration of Dalit issues in the Bengal region.

== Works ==
=== Poetry ===
- Jeebaner Naam Jantrana (The name of Life is Pain)
- Minati Keu Rakheni (Nobody Has Kept Request)
- Aamar Shabdai Shanita Astra (My Words as Sharpened Weapon)
- A Verse as a Sharpened Weapon (Translated into English by Satya Debnath)

=== Short Story ===
- Nepo Nidhan Parba (Nepo Slain Episode)
- Gondir Bandhe Bhangan (Dissolution in the Barrage of Circle)
- Vanga Banglar Dui Mukha (Two faces of Broken Bengal)
- Samaj Chetanar Galpo
- Stories of Social Awakening: Reflections of Dalit Refugee Lives of Bengal (translated from Bangla into English by Jaydeep Sarangi)

=== Novel ===
- Aamriter Jiban Kotha (Life of Elixir)
- Shikarh Chhenrha Jeeban(Root Severing Life) (Autobiographical)

=== Research Articles ===
- Dalita Sahitya Aandalan (Dalit Literary Movement)
- Bastu Badi Motua Aandalan (Materialistic Motua Movement)
- Satya Aannetion (In Search of Truth)
- Itihasher Aloke Sri Hari Guruchand o Matua Aandalan (Sri Hari Guruchand in the light of History and Matua Movement)

== See also ==
- Dalit Literature
