= Manohar Mouli Biswas =

Indian poet

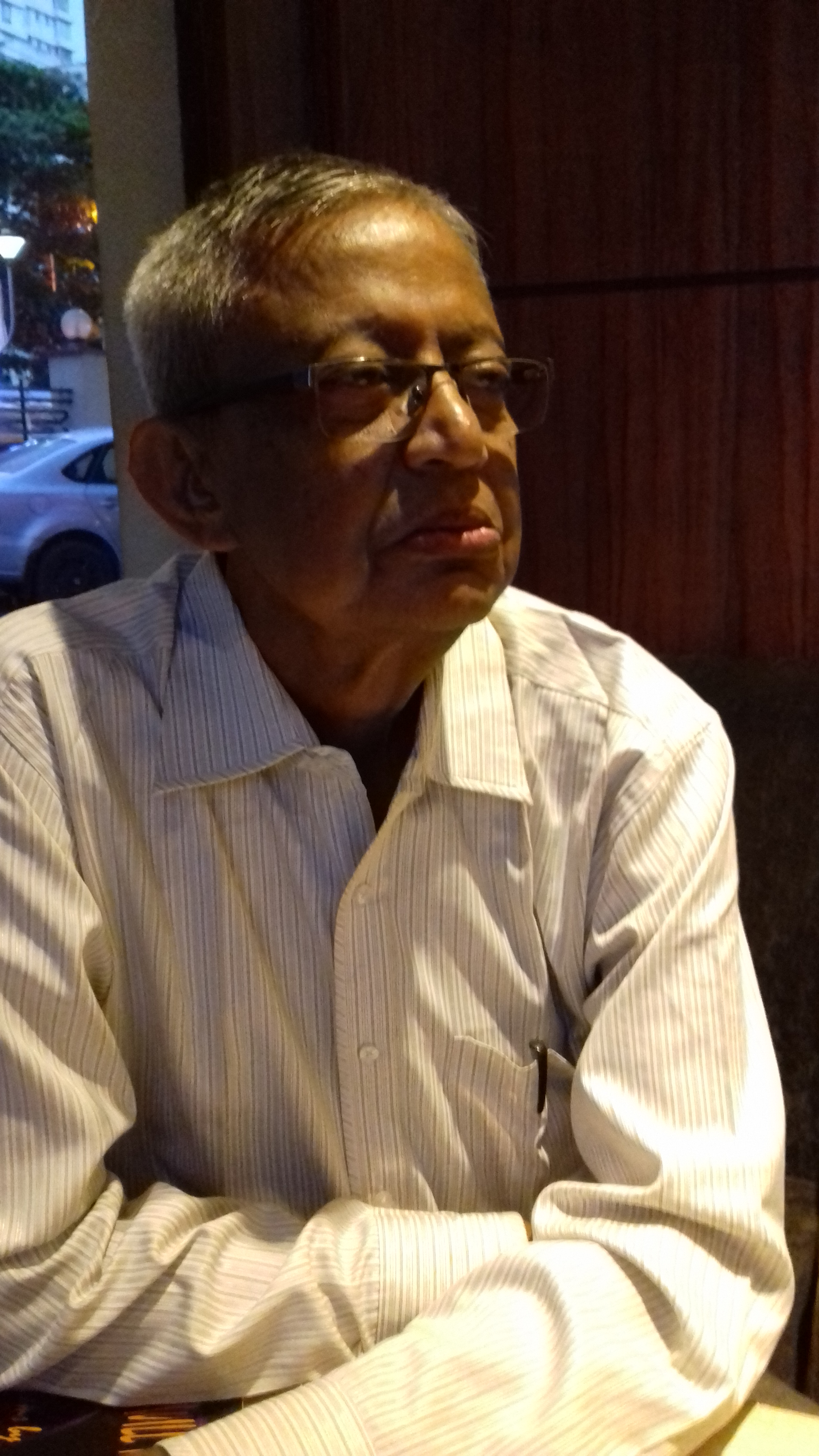
- Born: 3 October 1943 (age 82); Dakshin Matiargati, Bagerhat, Undivided Bengal, British India
- Occupations: Bilingual writer and poet
- Parent(s): Late Prahlad Chandra Biswas and Late Panchu Bala Biswas

Manohar Mouli Biswas, also known as Manohar Biswas, is a bilingual poet, essayist, and contributor to Dalit Literature from the Bengal region.

== Life and career ==
Manohar Mouli Biswas was born into the Namasudra caste in Dakshin Matiargati, Khulna, East Bengal, in 1943.

He is the current President of Bangla Dalit Sahitya Sanstha.

He has published four volumes of poetry, a collection of short stories, seven essay anthologies, and an autobiography titled "Amar Bhubaney Ami Benche Thaki" (2013). The latter has been translated by Angana Dutta and Jaydeep Sarangi as "Surviving in My World: Growing Up Dalit in Bengal" (2015).

== Poems in translation ==
His poems are translated widely from Bangla into English and into other languages.

ফুলন দেবী

চব্বিশবারের বদলা নিয়ে ছিলে একুশটি ইচ্ছা তো ছিল চব্বিশটির এই সাহস তোমাকে কে দিয়েছিল? অপমান, না লজ্জা ঢাকার পণ? শুনেছি, হে ফুলন, তুমি শূদ্রা ছিলে দূর গাঁয়ের দরিদ্র দুর্বলার যারা বলাৎকারী জেনে নিক এই সত্য বেহড়বাগী ফুলন প্রতিটি রমনী।

Translation:

Phoolan Devi

At the age of twenty four
She gun fired all
Against humiliation
Her determination registered
Oh! Phoolan, you have come from
The lowest caste
From a marginalised village.
Oppressors of women, be aware of it—
She resists at some points;
Every woman is a Phoolan in spirit

সংগ্রাম

আমার শরীরের জ্যান্ত মাংসের মধ্যে কিল বিল হাঁটে, কাটে, পোকা? ভিনসার অলিতে গলিতে ক্যান্সার, খরার গোটা শরীরটাকে টুকরো টুকরো- হায়রে, খান্ খান্ ঝরে কেন? লাল পতাকা রক্তের নেশা প্রতিরোধ কনিকার প্রয়াস তরতরে তাজা ব্যক্তিতে আমার গোটা শরীরটার প্রয়োজন ওই সংগ্রাম প্রতিটি ক্ষয়িত কোষের বাঁচার।

Translation:

Warfare
In the flesh alive of my body
The worms eat up, bit by bit.
Why does the cancer spread in streets of the whole body?
Red flag has thirst for blood;
A rose of revolt.
All my decaying cells
Restore the spirit I have
To live as rails of protest.

- translated by Jaydeep Sarangi

== List of works ==
=== Poetry collections ===
- Ora Amar Kabita (8 May 1985), Dipali Book House, Kolkata, West Bengal
- Tarer Kanna : Titiksha (31 December 1987), J/3 Tangra Govt. Housing Estate; distributed by Aditya Prakashalaya, Kolkata, West Bengal
- Vivikto Uthaney Ghar (June 1991), J/3 Tangra Housing Estate; distributed by Dipali Book House, Kolkata, West Bengal
- Poetic Rendering As Yet Unborn, (Translation of Bangla poetry in English) (2010), published by Shubhra Biswas in Calcutta Book Fair 2010, Kolkata, West Bengal, ISBN 978-81-926702-1-8
- Bikshata Kaler Banshi (16 August 2013), Chaturtha Dunia, Stall22 Bhabani Dutta Lane, Kolkata, West Bengal, ISBN 978-81-926702-5-6
- The Wheel Will Turn (Translation of Bangla poetry in English) (2014), Cyberwit.net, Allahabad, India, ISBN 978-81-928187-3-3

=== Short story ===
- Krishna Mrittikar Manoosh(8 May 1988), published by Satyabrata Majumdar; distributed by Nirmal Book Agency, Kolkata, West Bengal

=== Autobiography ===
- Amar Bhubaney Ami Benche Thaki (13 June 2013), Chaturtha Dunia, Kolkata ISBN 978-81-926702-4-9
- Surviving in My World : Growing Up Dalit in Bengal (2015), Stree ISBN 978-81-926702-4-9

=== Essays ===
- Dalit Sahityer Digboloy (1992), J/3 Tangra Govt. Housing Estate; distributed by Dr. Ambedkar Prakashani, Dalua, Garia, South 24 Parganas, West Bengal
- Yuktivadi Bharatbarsha: Ekti Aitihyer Sandhan (1998), Chaturtha Dunia, Kolkata, ISBN 81-86551-13-1
- Vonnochokhe Prabandha Mala (14 April 2003), Chaturtha Dunia, Kolkata ISBN 978-81-926702-6-3
- Dalit Sahityer Ruparekha (February 2007), Bani Silpa, Kolkata
- Prabandhe Prantajan Authoba Asprisher Diary (January 2010), Chaturtha Dunia, Kolkata, ISBN 978-81-926702-2-5
- An Interpretation of Dalit Literature, Aesthetic, Theory and Movements: Through the Lens of Ambedkarism (January 2017), published by Shubhra Biswas on behalf of Bangla Dalit Sahitya Sanstha, and Chaturtha Dunia, Kolkata, ISBN 978-81-926702-7-0

=== Edited books ===
- Adwaita Malla Barman: Ekti Sahityik Pratishrot (1995), Chaturtha Duniua, Kolkata
- Shatobarsher Bangla Dalit Sahitya: Bangla Dalit Writings from 1911–2010 (26 January 2011), Chaturtha Dunia, Kolkata, ISBN 978-81-926702-3-2
- Chaturtha Duniar Galpa (2005), Chaturtha Dunia, Kolkata
- Krishna Chandra Thakur (Kesto Sadhu): Smriti Sambhar (1999), Chaturtha Dunia, Kolkata
- Anya Bhashar Dalit Kabita (September 1994), Chaturtha Dunia, Kolkata

=== Magazine/editorial ===
- Dalit Mirror (Govt. of India Registration no 71031/97), ISBN 978-81-926702-0-1

== See also ==
- Dalit Literature
- Manoranjan Byapari
