= Mohan Dass Naimishray =

Indian writer of Dalit ancestry

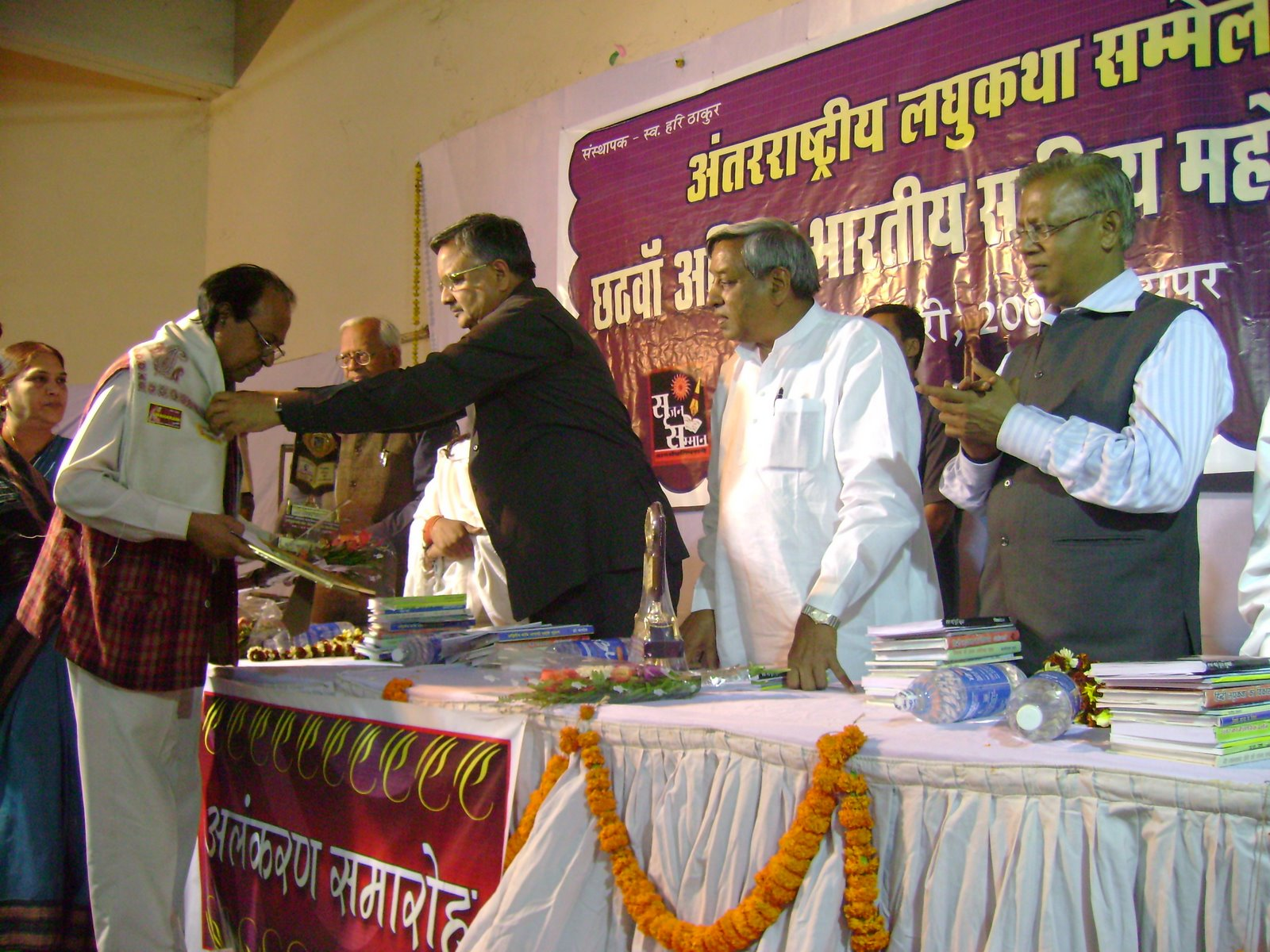
Mohandas Namisray deliberative creation story writing for receiving the honor conferred by Mahesh Tiwari.

Mohan Dass Naimishray is an Indian writer of Dalit ancestry.

His autobiography, Apne-Apne Pinjarey, is a well known work in Dalit literature.
