= Sinnar Niphad Assembly constituency =

Constituency of the Maharashtra legislative assembly in India

Sinnar Niphad
- Former constituency for the Maharashtra Legislative Assembly

Constituency details
- Country: India
- Region: Western India
- State: Maharashtra
- Established: 1952
- Abolished: 1955
- Total electors: 92,494

Sinnar Niphad Assembly constituency was an assembly constituency in the India state of Maharashtra. After 1955 Delimitation act, it was split into Sinnar and Niphad.

== Members of the Legislative Assembly ==
Election	Member	Party
1952	Naik Vasant Narayan	Indian National Congress
1952	Rankhambe Amritrao Dhondiba	Indian National Congress

== Election results ==
=== Assembly Election 1952 ===
1952 Bombay State Legislative Assembly election : Sinnar Niphad
Party	Candidate	Votes	%	±%
INC	Naik Vasant Narayan	27,217	23.27%	New
INC	Rankhambe Amritrao Dhondiba	24,848	21.24%	New
Kamgar Kisan Paksha	Wagh Deoram Sayaji	15,947	13.63%	New
Kamgar Kisan Paksha	Hire Mogalrao Yadavrao	12,899	11.03%	New
Socialist	Waghaokar Raghunath Ramchandra	11,004	9.41%	New
SCF	Dani Shantabai Dhanaji	10,240	8.76%	New
Independent	Gite Rabhaji Sambhuji	8,032	6.87%	New
PWPI	More Shivaji Ganpat	3,456	2.95%	New
Independent	Pagare Divakar Neoji	1,698	1.45%	New
Independent	Aware Motiram Narayan	1,619	1.38%	New
Margin of victory		11,270	9.64%	
Turnout		116,960	63.23%	
Total valid votes		116,960		
Registered electors		92,494		
INC win (new seat)				
