= Yendluri Sudhakar =

Telugu Dalit writer

- Born: 21 January 1958; Pamula Basti, Nizamabad, Telangana, India
- Died: 28 January 2022 (aged 64)
- Education: Osmania University (MA, Phil); Potti Sriramulu Telugu University (PhD)
- Occupation: Professor
- Writing career
- Notable work: Speaking Sandals: Narratives from the Madigawadas of Ongole

Yendluri Sudhakar Rao (21 January 1958 – 28 January 2022) was a prominent Dalit writer and academic. He was a member of the jury of the Sahitya Akademi and a member of the Telugu Advisory Council.

== Early life ==
Yendluri was born on 21 January 1959 in his grandmother's house in Pamula Basti, Nizamabad. He was the first child of Devaiah and Shantabai. He had two younger brothers and two younger sisters. His education began in a street school in Hyderabad. He studied Oriental Studies at Nallakunta Oriental College. Later, he pursued his MA and MPhil at Osmania University. He completed his PhD at Potti Sriramulu Telugu University.

== Career ==
Sudhakar worked as a Telegu pandit at Wesley Boys' High School in Secunderabad from 1985 to 1990. He was the assistant editor of the literary magazine Vajmayi published by the Telegu University. From 2009 until his death, he served as the Professor and Dean of the Literary Chair. He was then working as a professor in the Department of Telugu at the University of Hyderabad.

== Writings ==
Sudhakar was considered amongst the contemporary Telegu Dalit writers accomplishing the uncommon feat of writing everyday Dalit lives in regional dialect without Sanskrit influence. His Mallemoggala Godugu is a re-creation of the history of Madiga ancestors. Set in Raviguntapalli village, in Prakasam district of Andhra Pradesh, the short stories in the book are written in first-person and documents the everyday lives and experiences of the 'untouchable' caste. One of the stories in the book notes the community's expertise in handling dappu, a small drum used in folk dance and music traditions. He further explored dappu in his poem 'Drumbeat' to exemplify the celebratory remaking of Madiga self and a reimagining of thecommunity rooted equality and respect for all untouchable castes.

Mallemoggala Godugu was later translated into English by K. Purushotham as Speaking Sandals and published posthumously. Nikhil Sanjay-Rekha Adsule in his review of the book notes, "[the book] is a timely intervention and a stark reminder that socio-economic justice in democracy is still a mirage." The stories implicitly explain how caste inequality is an outcome of economic conditions, ideology, and politics.

He also did extensive research on the writings of Gurram Jashuva.

=== Selected books ===
- Vartamanam.
- Kotha Gabbilam.
- Mallemoggala Godugu (Narratives of Madiga Life).
- Atajani Ganache.

=== Translations ===
- Sharankumar Limbale's Akkarmasi from Hindi to Telegu.

=== Poems ===
- Drumbeat
- Gosangi

=== Translated works ===
- 1999. Karuvu (Famine). (translated into English by Alladi Uma, M. Sridhar).
- 2023. Speaking Sandals: Narratives from the Madigawadas of Ongole. (translated into English by K. Purushotham).

== Death ==
Sudhakar died of heart attack on 28 January 2022.

== See also ==
- Omprakash Valmiki
- Imayam
- P. Sivakami
- Kancha Ilaiah
- Annabhau Sathe
