= Muktabai Salve =

Indian author

- Born: 1840s
- Occupation: Writer
- Writing career
- Period: 1850s–1860s
- Subject: Dalit literature
- Notable work: Mang Maharanchya Dukkhavishayi (1855)

Muktabai Salve was a nineteenth-century Indian writer, who is considered one of the earliest Dalit women figures who contributed to the early Dalit literary movement. She is known for an early critique of caste and gender discrimination in her essay Mang Maharachya Dukhavishayi (lit. 'Grief of Mang-Mahars'). She belonged to the Mang community and was educated at a school run by social reformer Jyotirao Phule and his wife Savitribai Phule.

== Career ==
Born into the Mang community, Muktabai had studied in Jyotiba Phule and Savitribai Phule's school for around three years since the age of 10. Historian Shailaja Paik writes that Salve's 'newly acquired literacy' allowed her to articulate the social suffering of Untouchable communities and to question prevailing caste hierarchies and Brahman authority. In 1855, at the age of fourteen, Salve authored an essay titled Mang Maharachya Dukhavishayi (lit. 'Grief of Mang-Mahars') published in the Marathi periodical Dnyanodaya (lit. 'Rise of Knowledge'). In the essay, she discussed the caste based inequality and criticised Brahminical domination. Paik notes that through the essay Salve connected personal experiences of suffering with broader structures of gender and caste power in colonial society. In this context, Paik considers her "an early enunciator of intersectionality."

According to Hanumant Ajinath Lokhande, Salve's essay represents a significant early articulation of Dalit consciousness in literature and "the genealogy of Dalit literature can be traced in Salve's essay." Lokhande refers to her as the 'first Dalit feminist writer' of India.

Later, in 1946, Salve's essay was reprinted in the Dnyanodaya Centenary Volumes, edited by B. P. Hivale. Apart from her 1855 essay, little is known about Salve's later life. Sharmila Rege dedicated her book Writing Caste, Writing Gender to Salve and referred to her essay as "the first feminist testimonio."
