= Neerav Patel =

Gujarati and English language poet (1950–2019)

- Born: 2 December 1950; Bhuvaldi, Daskroi Taluka, Gujarat, India
- Died: 15 May 2019 (aged 68); Ahmedabad, Gujarat, India
- Education: Ph.D.
- Occupations: Poet, translator, editor
- Writing career
- Language: Gujarati, English
- Genre: Free verse
- Notable works: Burning From Both The Ends (1980); What Did I Do To Be Black and Blue (1987); Bahishkrut Phulo (2006)
- Literary movement: Dalit literature in Gujarati

Academic background
- Thesis: Gujarati Dalit Poetry 1978 to 2003: A study
- Doctoral advisor: D. S. Mishra

Neerav Patel (2 December 1950 – 15 May 2019) was a Gujarati and English language poet, translator and editor; primarily known for his contribution in Gujarati Dalit literature such as Burning From Both The Ends (1980, English poems), What Did I Do To Be Black and Blue (1987, English poems) and Bahishkrut Phulo (2006, Gujarati). He edited Swaman, a journal of Dalit writings in Gujarati.

== Biography ==
Neerav Patel was born in Bhuvaldi, a village in Daskroi Taluka of Ahmedabad district, in the Indian state of Gujarat. His birth name was Somo Hiro Chamar. He changed his name to Neerav Patel because he faced atrocities due to casteism. He earned a PhD in English literature. He served as a Bank Officer. After his retirement, he devoted his time to Dalit literature.

He started writing poetry in college, in 1967. He wrote only Dalit poetry based on Dalit people who are suffering atrocities, exploitation, discrimination and segregation.

He pioneered the movement of Gujarati Dalit literature, publishing the first ever Gujarati Dalit literary magazine Akrosh in 1978 under the auspices of the Dalit Panther of Gujarat. He edited short-lived Gujarati magazines with others namely Kalo Suraj, Sarvanam, Swaman and Vacha.

He died on 15 May 2019 at Ahmedabad following cancer.

== Works ==
Patel explored Dalit sensibility in his poems. He published two poetry collections in English, Burning From Both The Ends (1980) and What Did I Do To Be Black and Blue (1987). He published an anthology of Gujarati poems Bahishkrut Phulo in 2006. His other works are Severed Tongue Speaks Out (2014) and Wanted Poets (2019, posthumous).

== Recognition ==
He received the Mahendra Bhagat Prize (2004–2005) from Gujarati Sahitya Parishad, and the Sant Kabir Dalit Sahitya Award (2005) from the Government of Gujarat.

== See also ==
- List of Gujarati-language writers
