= Babytai Kamble =

Indian Dalit activist and writer

- Born: c. 1929; Veergaon, Purandar taluka, Pune district, Maharashtra, India
- Died: 21 April 2012 (aged 82–83); Phaltan, Satara district, Maharashtra, India
- Occupations: Writer, activist
- Known for: Dalit feminism
- Notable work: Jina Amucha (transl. The Prisons We Broke)
- Spouse: Kondiba Kamble

Baby Kondiba Kamble (c. 1929 – 21 April 2012), commonly known as Babytai Kamble, was an Indian Dalit activist, feminist, and writer. Born into the Mahar community, the largest Dalit community in Maharashtra, she was influenced by B. R. Ambedkar, a prominent national leader. Her autobiography Jina Amucha (Marathi: जिणं आमुचं, lit. 'Our Life') is regarded as the first autobiography by a Dalit woman in Marathi, and possibly the first in any Indian language.

== Early life ==
Babytai Kamble was born in 1929 in Veergaon village, Purandar taluka, Pune district, Maharashtra, into the Mahar caste. Her father worked as a labour contractor and her maternal grandfather and grand-uncles worked as butlers for the British. Because her father traveled frequently, she spent much of her childhood with her maternal grandparents. Babytai’s grandmother, Sitavahini, had led the revolution against eating dead cattle meat. Babytai went to a girls school which was dominated and run by Brahmins, where she and other Dalit girls were subject to discrimination and segregation.

Babytai was married at the age of thirteen to Kondiba Kamble, after passing the fourth standard. The bride, groom and their families had a marriage ceremony without a Brahmin priest as officiator. The couple started a small business selling grapes, later expanding to vegetables and eventually opening a provisions store primarily serving the Mahar community. Their customers were predominantly from the Mahar community. While sitting at the shop counter, Kamble began reading newspapers that were used for packing. It was around this time she began writing her own experiences, inspired by the lack of representation of the marginalized, especially Dalit women in those stories. She also joined a library and began reading books from there.

Babytai and Kondiba had ten children, three of whom died during childhood. Kamble and her family converted to Buddhism and remained lifelong practicing Buddhists.

== Writing ==
Babytai kept her writings secret from her family for nearly twenty years. Maxine Berntsen, a feminist scholar conducting her research in Phaltan, became interested in her writings and encouraged Babytai to publish her writings. Her autobiography Jina Amucha was born out of these writings.

=== Jina Amucha ===
Jina Amucha is an autobiography written in Marathi. It was first published as a book in 1986 by Sugawa Prakashan, with parts of the work published previously in the Marathi women's magazine Stree between 1982 and 1984. Considered as the first autobiography by a Dalit woman in Marathi, possibly the first in any Indian language, Jina Amucha is recognized as a seminal work in Dalit literature, with one of the most important accounts in Indian literature on caste, poverty, violence, and triple discrimination faced by Dalit women. The book provides a detailed account of the lives of Mahars in Maharashtra, offering insight into the community's experiences with extreme poverty, caste discrimination, social customs, and superstitions. It is noted for providing a Dalit feminist perspective, analysing patriarchal norms within the Mahar community alongside oppression by upper castes. Kamble viewed her work as a testimony of her entire community.

One of the major portions of the book articulates caste and gender discrimination and multilayered violence suffered by Dalit women at the hands of the upper caste and Dalit men. Kamble writes from an dalit woman's perspective, not deterring from naming patriarchy in the dalit community nor sparing the internalized patriarchy by Dalit women. This honesty and reflexivity has been largely missing in upper caste women's writings. Kamble also underscores how upper caste Hindu women and men treated dalits with contempt, disgust, and hate.

The book was translated into English by Maya Pandit as The Prisons We Broke. The first English edition was published in 2008 by Orient Longman (later Orient Blackswan), and a second edition, including Kamble's prefaces from the Marathi editions, followed in 2018. The book has also been translated into other languages, including Hindi (as Jeevan Hamara), Tamil (as Suthanthira Kaatru), and French.

=== Other works ===
Kamble also published collections of poetry in Marathi, including Man Bolata, 'The Mind Speaks', which focused on the teachings of Ambedkar and the empowerment of the Mahar community. She also wrote articles on Dalit lives.

== Activism ==
Kamble was deeply influenced by B. R. Ambedkar and became involved in the Dalit movement in Maharashtra from a young age. She attended public meetings organized by Dalit activists and became an active member of the Mahila Mandal (women's group) in Phaltan, which focused on Dalit women's rights to education and employment. Later in life, she established a government-approved residential school (also referred to as an ashram shala) for children from socially backward and disadvantaged communities in Nimbure, a village near Phaltan.

== Death and legacy ==
She died on 21 April 2012, aged 82, in Phaltan, Maharashtra. In her community, she came to be admired as a writer and was fondly called as Tai (meaning sister). She is remembered as a pioneering Dalit feminist writer whose work provided a crucial perspective on the intersection of caste and gender oppression in India. She is one of the earliest women writers from the dalit communities whose distinctive reflexive style of feminist writing setting her apart from other Dalit writers and other caste women writers whose gaze was limited and reflexivity incarcerated in caste and masculinity.

Her life and writings continue to inspire discussions on social justice, feminism, and Dalit rights.

== Awards and recognition ==
- Matoshree Bhimabai Ambedkar Award (2001)

== See also ==
- Feminism in India
- Caste system in India
- Mukta Sarvagod
- Urmila Pawar
