= Rajni Tilak =

Indian Dalit rights activist and writer (1958–2018)

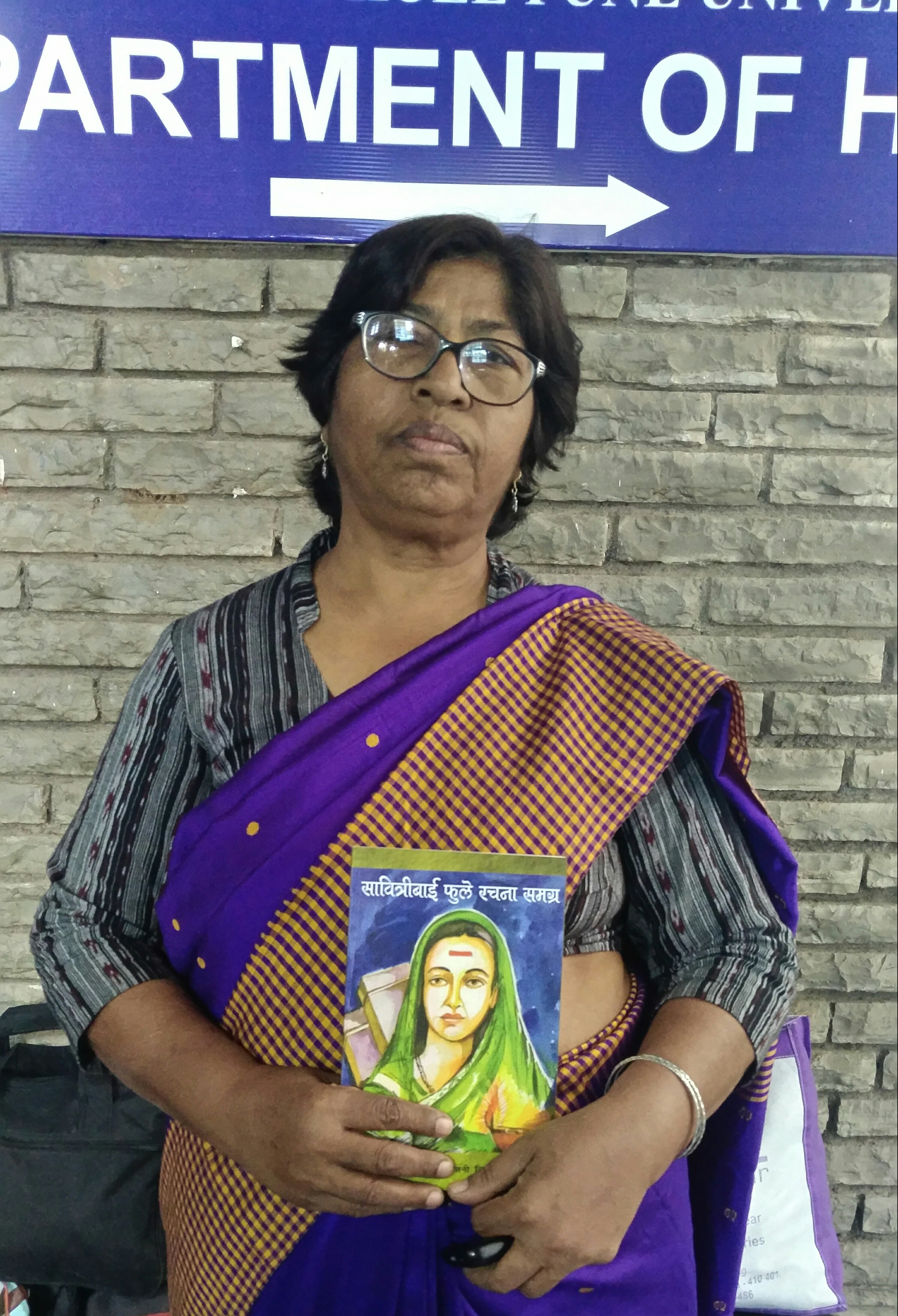
- Rajni Tilak at Savitribai Phule Pune University in 2017 (Note: Rajni Tilak with her translated work of Savitribai Phule's poems at Savitribai Phule Pune University in 2017, where she also received the Lifetime Achievement Award at the Dalit Women Speak Out Conference.)
- Born: 27 May 1958; Old Delhi, India
- Died: 30 March 2018 (aged 59); Delhi, India
- Occupations: Activist; writer; poet
- Known for: Dalit rights activism; Dalit feminism
- Notable work: Apni Zameen Apna Aasman (autobiography); Samkalin Bharthiya Dalit Mahila Lekhan (3 volumes)

Rajni Tilak (27 May 1958 – 30 March 2018) was one of the most prominent Indian Dalit rights activists and a leading voice of Dalit feminism and writing. She served as the executive director of the Centre for Alternative Dalit Media, co-founded the National Association of Dalit Organisations, and served as President of the Dalit Lekhak Sangh (Dalit Writers' Group).

== Early life ==
Tilak was born in Old Delhi, India on 27 May 1958 in a family with limited means. Her father was a tailor whose ancestors had migrated to Delhi from the state of Uttar Pradesh. Being the first of seven children, she had to give up on her aspiration of becoming a nurse due to lack of financial support and took up a job to aid her family. She had an early interest in writing, expressed by writing a poem called “Ka Se Kahu Dukh Apna” as her first poem. After completing her higher education in 1975, she joined ITI (Industrial Training Institute) for vocational courses like stenography, cutting and tailoring.

== Activism and career ==
While in college at ITI in Delhi, she organised a union for girls protesting the gender based discrimination faced by them. She found her strength as a leader, merging this group with the Progressive Students' Union (PSU). She later split from them citing ideological and political differences. She also went on to organise a 4000-strong organisation of anganwadi workers, to address demands of regularization of pay scale. Over the years Tilak became involved in Dalit activism and also made her mark by also challenging patriarchy within the caste dimension. She organised agitations over the Mathura rape case in 1972 all over Delhi and became associated with Saheli, an autonomous women's group. There onward she began working on issues of health, sanitation, counselling for family planning, rape, molestation, etc.

In the 1980s, Tilak started a union with Bharthiya Dalit Panthers in Delhi. They opened a Dalit theatre group called Ahahwan and started a students' awareness programme by establishing a youth study circle.

She was associated with multiple organisations, such as NACDAOR (National Confederation of Dalit and Adivasi Organizations), CADAM (Center for Alternative Dalit Media), NFDW (National Federation of Dalit Women), Rashtriya Dalit Mahila Andolan (RDMA), and many more.

In 2011, the Bollywood film Aarakshan (directed by Prakash Jha) caused controversy, as the director was alleged to have insulted Dalits. Tilak was asked to view the film before its release. In 2012, she was part of a coalition of Dalit and non-Dalit writers, scholars, and activists who petitioned the National Council of Educational Research and Training (NCERT) to correctly represent the role of Dr. B.R. Ambedkar in school textbooks.

== Literary work ==
- Bharat Ki Pehli Shikshika - Savitribai Phule (1998)
- Padchaap (2000) - volume of poetry
- Buddha Ne Ghar Kyon Chhoda (2005)
- Samkalin Bharthiya Dalit Mahila Lekhan Vol. 1 (2011) - compiled and edited anthology of Dalit women writing
- Samkalin Bharthiya Dalit Mahila Lekhan Vol. 2 (2015)
- Hawa se Bechain Yuvtiyan (2015) - volume of poetry
- Dalit Stree Vimarsh Avum Patrakarita (2016)
- Samkalin Bharthiya Dalit Mahila Lekhan Vol. 3 (2017)
- Savitribai Phule Rachna Samagra (2017) - compiled and translated works of Dalit activist Savitribai Phule
- Apni Zameen Apna Aasman (2017) - autobiography
- Dr. Ambedkar Aur Stree Chintan Ke Dastavez (2018) - compiled and edited

== Awards ==
- Outstanding Woman Achievers Award by National Commission for Women (2013)
- Lifetime Achievement Award at the Dalit Women Speak Out Conference (2017)

== Death ==
Tilak died on 30 March 2018 at the age of 59 at St Stephen's Hospital, Delhi. She had been taken to the hospital for treatment for an illness of the spine. She is survived by her daughter- actor, artist, activist and writer Jyotsna Siddharth.

Her death was mourned by several scholars and activists. Condolence meetings were held around the country and tributes were paid on social media websites including by her friend Kavita Srivastava, leader of People's Union for Civil Liberties (PUCL).
