= Shantabai Dhanaji Dani =

Indian Dalit writer and politician

Shantabai Dhanaji Dani (1919–2001) was an Indian Dalit writer, politician, and social worker. She wrote primarily in the Marathi language.

== Life and career ==
Dani was born in 1919, in impoverished circumstances, in Nashik, Maharashtra. She had several brothers and sisters, including three from her mother's previous marriage. Her father was a milkman. Dani was educated, at the urging of her mother and elder sister, Radhabai, both of whom had not received an education themselves. She received her schooling at the Mission Primary School in Nashik, continued at a high school in Gujarat, and undertook her collegiate education at the Women's Training College in Pune. Dani's memoirs record great poverty, hunger, and destitution, and describes practices of caste discrimination against her family by the local Hindu population.

While working towards her Bachelor of Arts, Dani joined a satyagraha movement led by her cousin's husband, Dada Saheb Gaikwad, calling for the representation of Scheduled Castes in legislative assemblies, and was briefly imprisoned in Yerwada Jail for this. In 1942, Dani attended a lecture by Dr. B. R. Ambedkar, and later met him, joining the Scheduled Castes Federation in support of his activism to end caste discrimination in India. She later became the president of the Scheduled Castes Federation.

In 1946, Dani led protests against the Poona Pact, and was arrested after she and other protesters entered the Pune Assembly Hall carrying black flags. She was detained in Yerwada Jail for this. When Dr. B. R. Ambedkar formed the Independent Labour Party, she joined it, and was elected a member of the Maharashtra Legislative Assembly between 1968 and 1974. She subsequently worked towards documenting landless labourers in Maharashtra, and towards improving access to education, serving as the secretary of the Ramabai Ambedkar Hospital established by Dada Saheb Gaikwad, and of several primary schools established for Dalit students in Nasik, Maharashtra. She was awarded an honorary doctorate in letters from the Yashwantrao Chavan Maharashtra Open University.

In 1987, Dani accepted the Savitribai Phule Award for contributions to education. She declined to accept a similar award from the Government of Maharashtra, issuing a statement calling for the use of the government's award funds to improve amenities for Dalits instead.

Dani converted to Buddhism, along with Dr. B. R. Ambedkar and several other Dalit leaders. Dani published an autobiography titled Ratradin Amha (tr. For Us, These Nights and Days) in 1990. The book was narrated by Dani and recorded by her friend, Bhavna Bhargave. The title of the book is taken from a song written by Sant Tukaram, which records the struggles faced by Dalit populations, stating, "For us, these nights and days pose a warlike situation." Her autobiography is considered a significant contribution to Dalit literature. An English translation has been published by Rajni Tilak.

== Sources ==
- Upadhyay, Vaishnavi (1990). Understanding Others: A Study of Dalit Women Writers in Bakhtinian Light. Gujarat University. hdl:10603/307838.
- Rege, Sharmila (2014). Writing Caste/Writing Gender: Narrating Dalit Women's Testimonies. New Delhi: Zubaan Books. ISBN 9789383074679.
