= Daya Singh Arif =

Punjabi poet and theologist

- Born: 1894; Jalalabad East, Kot Ise Khan, Faridkot, Punjab, British India
- Died: 1945 (aged 50–51); Moga, Punjab, India
- Occupations: Poet, Writer, Composer and Singer.
- Writing career
- Language: Punjabi
- Period: British Raj Era
- Genre: Punjabi literature
- Notable works: Zindagi Bilas, Fanah da Makan, Suputtar Bilas
- Literary movement: Punjabi Dalit Literature

Sadhu Daya Singh Arif (1894–1945) was a Punjabi poet, theologian and balladeer.

== Personal life ==
Daya Singh was born into Mazhabi Sikh community to Santa Singh at Punjab, British India.

== Career ==
He read wide range of secular literature and as also reached the stage of ‘brahmgiani’ through meditation and contemplation like Sadhu Wazir Singh which is apparent from his assuming the title of ‘Arif’.

His book, Atam Hamrahi, is one of prominence among Punjabi Dalit literature.
