= Kumud Pawde =

Kumud Somkuwar Pawde (born c. 1938) is an Indian Dalit activist. She is the first Ambedkarite scholar of Sanskrit. Her autobiography Antahsphot (transl. Outburst) discusses the issue of exploitation of Dalit Women. She is a founder member of the National Federation of Dalit Women.

She was born in 1938 into a Mahar Dalit family in Maharashtra. Later she became a Buddhist. She was witness to the historic Dhamma Deeksha ceremony (conversion to Buddhism) on October 14, 1956, as her parents were part of Babasaheb Ambedkar’s Dalit Buddhist movement. She studied Sanskrit at the time when untouchability was rife and Dalits faced barriers; she was amongst first Dalits to learn Sanskrit and became Sanskrit Pandita i.e. Sanskrit scholar. She was the Head of Department of Sanskrit from Government College, Amravati, Maharashtra.
