= Wandana Sonalkar =

Indian economist, translator, and author

- Born: Maharashtra, India
- Education: University of Cambridge
- Occupations: Economist, author, translator and feminist scholar
- Years active: 1976 - 2017
- Known for: Dalit rights, women's rights
- Notable work: Why I Am Not a Hindu Woman: A Personal Story

Wandana Sonalkar is an Indian economist, author, translator and feminist scholar known for her work on gender, caste, and social inequalities in India. She is a retired professor of Women’s and Gender Studies at the Tata Institute of Social Sciences (TISS), Mumbai, and has made significant contributions to the study of caste-based and gender-based discrimination, particularly in the context of Hinduism and Hindutva.

Sonalkar is also recognised for her translations of Marathi texts into English, including works by Urmila Pawar and R.B. More.

Sonalkar is the author of Why I am Not a Hindu Woman, an autobiography and critique of misogyny, caste and violence in the context of the Hindu religion.

== Early life and education ==
Wandana Sonalkar was born into an upper-caste, middle-class Hindu family in Maharashtra, India. She pursued her undergraduate studies in mathematics and economics at the University of Cambridge, later earning a Ph.D. in economics from Dr. Babasaheb Ambedkar Marathwada University in Aurangabad, India.

Her academic background and personal experiences as a woman in a Hindu household informed her later scholarly and activist work, particularly her critiques of caste and patriarchal structures.

== Academic career ==
Sonalkar began her academic career as a professor of economics at Dr. Babasaheb Ambedkar Marathwada University, where she played a pivotal role in establishing an institute there for women's studies. She also served at Aurangabad University.

She later joined the Tata Institute of Social Sciences in Mumbai, where she served as a professor in the Advanced Centre for Women’s Studies within the School of Development Studies until her retirement in 2017. At TISS, she also served as the director of the Tarabai Shinde Women’s Studies Centre.

She is one of the founders of the Aalochana Centre for Documentation and Research on Women, a non-profit organization dedicated to research on caste and gender in India.

Her research primarily focuses on the intersections of gender, caste, and class in Indian society. Sonalkar has written extensively on the systemic inequalities embedded in Brahmanical Hinduism and the political ideology of Hindutva, emphasizing their impact on women and marginalized communities. Her work draws on both empirical evidence and personal narratives to critique social and political structures.

Sonalkar's research has been published in Economic and Political Weekly, the Asian Journal of Women's Studies, and Social Scientist. She has also worked on developing curricula that teach social sciences in India through bilingual communication.

== Writing and translation ==
Sonalkar has translated several books by Dalit authors from Marathi to English. These include We Also Made History: Women in the Ambedkarite Movement in Maharashtra by Urmila Pawar and Meenakshi Moon, Urmila Pawar's autobiography, The Weave of My Life, and the autobiography of Dalit activist R.B. More.

Sonalkar's translation of R.B. More's autobiography was reviewed in The Hindu, and The Wire. She has also published shorter translated works of stories by Priya Tendulkar, Shyam Manohar, and others, in Indian Literature.

In 2021, Sonalkar published Why I am Not a Hindu Woman: A Personal Story (Women Unlimited), an autobiographical work that critiques the misogyny, casteism and violence inherent in Hinduism and its political manifestation Hindutva. The book was reviewed in The Hindu, The Tribune and Business Standard, and is noted for its feminist perspective and engagement with lived experiences.

== Bibliography ==
Books

- (2021) Why I am Not a Hindu Woman (Women Unlimited) ISBN 9789385606311

Translations (from Marathi to English)

- (2009) Urmila Pawar, The Weave of My Life: a Dalit Woman's Memoirs (Columbia University Press) ISBN 9780231520577
- (2019) Satyendra More, Memoirs of a Dalit Communist: The Many Worlds of R.B. More (ed. Anupama Rao, trans. Wandana Sonalkar, LeftWord) ISBN 9788194077800
- (2014) We Also Made History: Women in the Ambedkarite Movement in Maharashtra by Urmila Pawar and Meenakshi Moon (trans. Wandana Sonalkar, Zubaan Books) ISBN 9789383074747
