= Joopaka Subhadra =

Indian Telugu Dalit writer (born 1962)

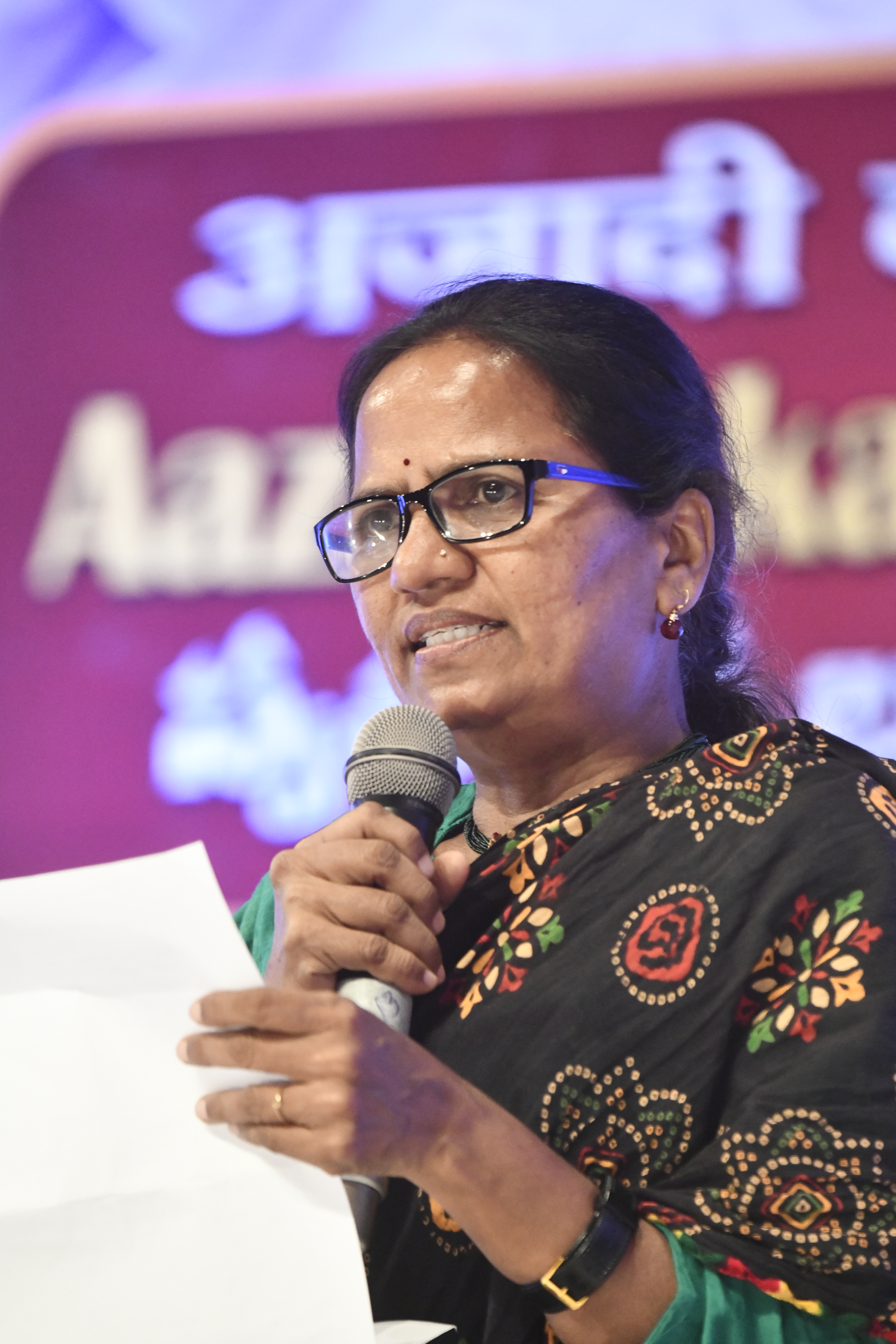
- Born: Damaranchepalle, Warangal, Telangana
- Education: Kakatiya University, Warangal
- Occupations: Author, social activist
- Known for: Writings on Dalit women

Joopaka Subhadra (also Jupaka and Jūpāka; born 1962) is a Telugu Dalit activist, poet, and writer. She writes poems and short stories that shed light on the lives of Dalits, specifically Dalit women. She is currently working at the Andhra Pradesh Secretariat.

== Early life and education ==
Subhadra was born in Damaranchepalle, Warangal district (present Telangana). She is youngest of 12 siblings, born to Narasimha and Kanaka Veeramma. While studying, she lived in a social welfare hostel. Subhadra has been writing poetry since childhood, beginning with subjects like nature, beauty, and friendship.

Subhadra holds Master of Arts and Masters of Philosophy degrees in Telugu Literature. She is an alumnus of Kakatiya University, Telangana. She has also written numerous political essays, book reviews, songs and journalistic pieces. Through her work, she has been instrumental in establishing the Mattipoolu (SC, ST, BC, and Minority) Women Writers’ Forum. She has also contributed a column to a well-known feminist journal, Bhoomika, and also in journals such as Andhra Jyoti, Ekalavya, Vaartha, and Udyoga Kranti. After starting work at the Andhra Pradesh Secretariat in 1988, she started a Woman's Association for the female employees. In 2015, she was awarded the Amruthala award from the Apuroopa Awards Foundation for her work as a columnist.

== Works ==
Subhadra's work is based on her own life experiences. Her work includes:

- Rayakka Manyam, A collection of short stories on different aspects of Dalit life.
- Ayyayyō dammakkā (in Telugu). Haidarābād. 2009. OCLC 463973219.
- Kaitunakala daṇḍeṃ (in Telugu). with Kr̥pākar Mādiga Ponugōṭi. Haidarābād. 2008. OCLC 313020449.
- Nallarēgaṭi sāllu (in Telugu). with Gōgu Śyāmala. Haidarābād. 2008. OCLC 170206399.
- Shuddi Cheyyali depicting the hard work done by Dalit women
