= Vijila Chirappad =

- Born: 1980 or 1981 (age 44–45) Kozhikode, Kerala, India
- Occupation: Poet
- Language: Malayalam

Vijila Chirappad (born 1980 or 1981) is an Indian Dalit poet who writes in Malayalam.

== Life and work ==
Born in Kozhikode, Kerala, Chirappad's poems speak of the experience of living life as a Dalit woman. Her poetry explores how the double burden of gender and caste shapes the lives and struggles of Dalit women in Kerala in distinct ways than women of dominant castes. Her work also discusses how, despite Kerala's communist history, casteism pervades everyday life there.

In our home
There is no TV
No fridge
Neither mixer
Nor grinder
No LPG
Not even an iron-box.
Yet my mother knew
How to operate these
Much before I did.
Because
Like in Madhavikutty’s stories
And the novels of MT
She is Janu-
The servant.

— She Who Flew Afore, Vijila Chirappad

Chirappad's work includes three collections of poetry in Malayalam: Adukala Illathaa Veedu (A Home without a Kitchen, 2006), Amma Oru Kalpanika Kavitha Alla (Mother is not a Poetic Figment of our Imagination, 2009), and Pakarthi Ezhuthu (Copied Notes, 2015). Her poems "A Place for Me", "Can't Grow My Nails" and "The Autobiography of a Bitch" have also been included in the 2012 Oxford India Anthology of Malayalam Dalit Writing.

chandrika chechi of the Wasteland
talks
about the homes one enters
only through the back door.

of the flats
where one enters
through the front door —
the ones with the porch light on.

returning daily from the marketplace
both the fish and she share
the same path —
the one through the back door.

entering through the very same route,
while hearing the television
blare the pledge aloud on August 15 —
all Indians are my brothers and sisters.

— Wasteland, Virila Chirappad

Chirappad has participated in the Kerala Literature festival and also in the prestigious Hay Festival of Literature and Arts as part of an event on Dalit Poetry in Malayalam.
