= P. Sivakami =

Indian Civil Servant and writer

P. Sivakami (born 30 November 1957) is a former Indian Administrative Services officer, activist, and dalit-feminist writer predominantly writing in Tamil. Her notable works include Pazhayana Kazhidalum, Kurruku Vettu, Nalum Thodarum and Kadaisi Mandhar. Apart from being one of the most prominent Dalit novelists in India, having written six novels and more than 60 short stories, she has also constantly voiced her opinions on contemporary social and political issues. P. Sivakami has worked as an editor and contributed to the monthly magazine Puthiya Kodangi since 1995. She is a significant presence on social media through her Twitter account.

== Early life and education ==
P. Sivakami was born in Perambalur,Tamil Nadu. Her father, M. Palanimuthu, is an independent MLA. She has graduate and post-graduate degrees in history.

== Career ==
=== Early career ===
In an interview with The Business Standard in February 2016, she said, "Bureaucracy has treated me like an untouchable".

=== Literary career ===
Since 1995, she has been centrally involved in the publication of the literary journal Puthiya Kodangi and has a lively investment in issues that touch Dalit and other backward castes and women in Tamil Nadu. She is the first Tamil Dalit Woman to write a novel Pazhiyana Kazhidalum in 1989. A literary and commercial success, the novel created a stir by taking on patriarchy in the Dalit movement. The novel is translated by the author herself and published in English as The Grip of Change (2006). Her second novel Anandhayi is about the violent treatment of women and was translated into English by Pritham K Chakravarthy as The Taming of Women in 2011. Her first poetry collection, Kadhavadaippu, was published in October 2011. Sivakami has written four critically acclaimed novels, all of them centred on Dalit and Feminist themes. She has written numerous short stories and poems focusing on similar issues. Sivakami's novels portray the rustic story of women who suffer at the hands of men who strongly believe in and stand for patriarchy. The conflicts and struggles are between tenacious women and tyrannical men in the contemporary society.

Sivakami made a short film Ooodaha (Through) based on a story written by one of her friends. Set in 1995, it was selected by the National Panorama and won the President Award the same year.

== Political career ==
She quit the Indian Administrative Service in 2008 after 29 years and joined politics a year later, contesting the Lok Sabha polls from Kanyakumari representing the Bahujan Samaj Party (BSP). However, she lost the elections.

In 2009, she founded her own political party, Samuga Samathuva Padai, which was based on the principles of the Dalit icon B. R. Ambedkar.

== Works ==
- Pazhayani Kazhidalum ("In the Grip of Change", 1988) (cf. 2013)
- Pazhayani Kazhidalum Asiriyar Kurippu ("Author's Notes for The Grip of Change", 1995)
- Kurruku Vettu (1999)
- Ippadiku Ungal Yadharthamulla (1986)
- Nalum Thodarum (1989)
- Kadaisi Mandhar (1995)
- Kadaigal (2004)
- Anandhayi
- Kadhavadaippu (2011)
- Pal̲aiyan̲a kal̲italum, பழையன கழிதலும், 2013 (First version 1988)
  - in German: Die Zeiten ändern sich. Transl. Thomas Vogel. Draupadi, Heidelberg 2020
- Udal Arasiyal ("Body Politics", essays)
