= Jaydeep Sarangi =

Indian writer

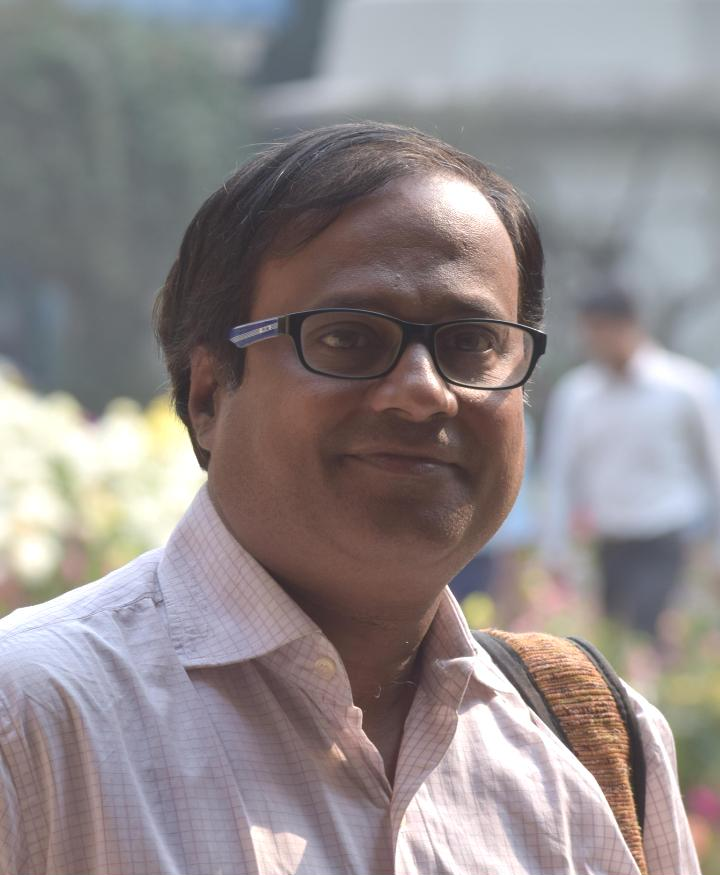
- Born: Jhargram, West Bengal, India
- Occupations: Poet, author, editor, translator, critic
- Writing career
- Period: Postmodern Indian-English literature

Jaydeep Sarangi (Bengali: জয়দীপ ষড়ঙ্গী) is an Indian writer, poet, and critic. He is serving as the principal of New Alipore College, Kolkata.

== Early life ==
Jaydeep Sarangi was born on 11 December 1973 in Jhargram, West Bengal.

== See also ==
- Dalit Literature
