= Urmila Pawar =

Marathi writer (born 1945)

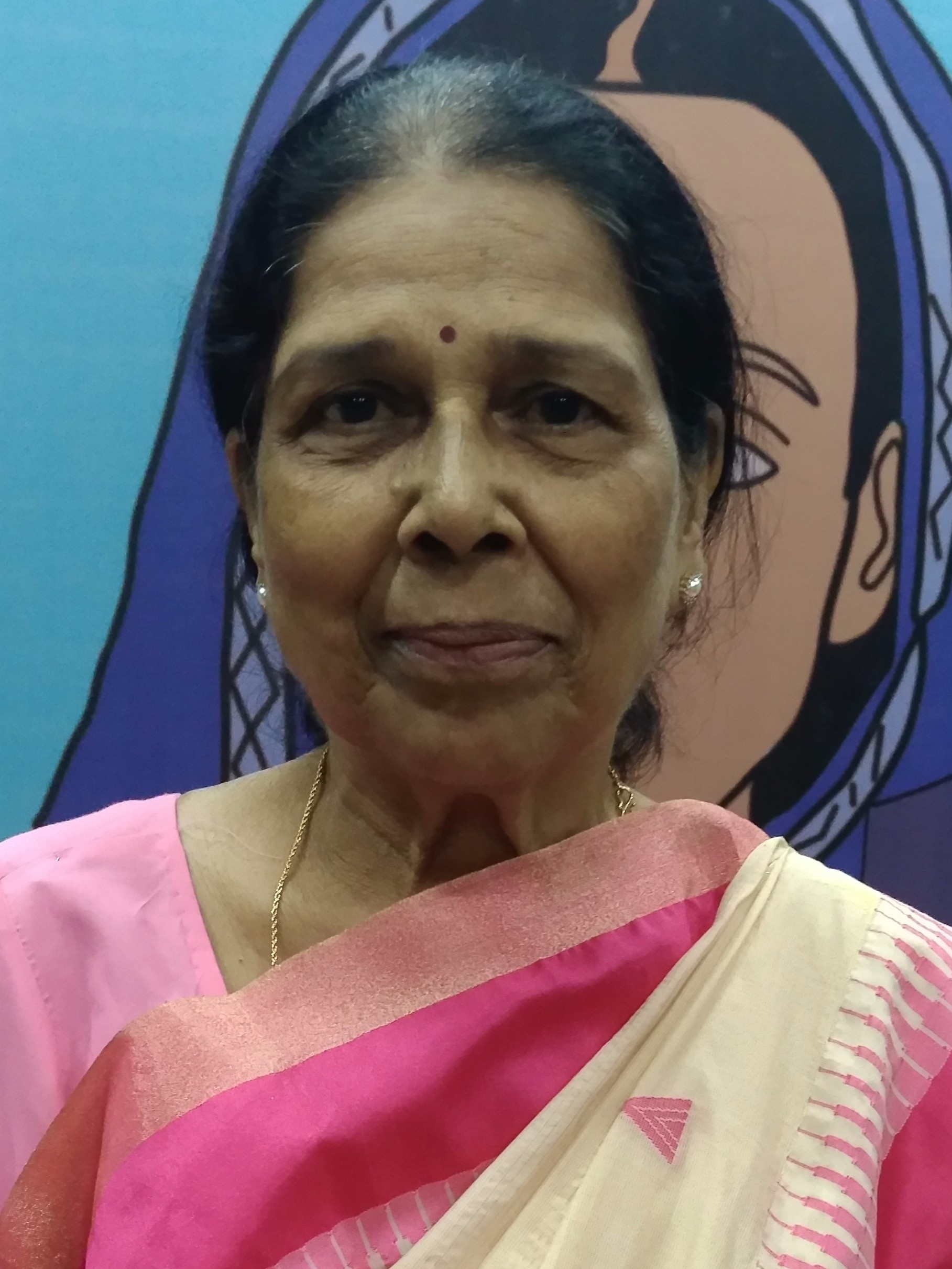
- Urmila Pawar in 2017
- Born: 1945 (age 80–81); Argaon, Ratnagiri, Bombay Presidency, British India (now Maharashtra, India)
- Occupations: Writer; Activist
- Writing career
- Language: Marathi
- Years active: 1980s–present
- Subjects: Caste, Feminism; Social Justice
- Notable works: Aaidan (The Weave of My Life: A Dalit Woman’s Memoirs); Kavach; A Childhood Tale
- Notable awards: Matoshree Bhimabai Ambedkar Award (2004); Laxmibai Tilak Award (declined)
- Literary movement: Dalit movement, Feminist movement

Urmila Pawar (born 1945) is an Indian writer and activist in the Dalit and feminist movements. Writing primarily in Marathi, her works have often been hailed as a critique of social discrimination and the savarna exploitation by commentators and media outlets.

Pawar's short stories including "Kavach" and "A Childhood Tale" are widely read and form the part of the curriculum at various Indian universities. Her documentation with Meenakshi Moon on the participation of dalit women was a major contribution to the construction of dalit history from a feminist perspective in India.

Pawar's autobiography Aidan (Weave), which was one of the first of its kind account by a dalit woman, won her acclaim and numerous accolades. The book was later translated into English by Maya Pandit and released under the title The Weave of My Life: A Dalit Woman’s Memoirs. Wandana Sonalkar has written the foreword for the book.

== Early life and education ==
Pawar was born in 1945 in Adgaon village of Ratnagiri district in the Konkan district of Bombay Presidency (now the state of Maharashtra). When she was 12 years old, she and her family converted to Buddhism along with other members of their community after B. R. Ambedkar called for people from the Dalit community to renounce Hinduism.

She has described how her community lived in the centre of the village, unlike Dalit communities elsewhere in the Presidency that were usually expected to live at the periphery. Her father was a teacher in a school for untouchable children. She has also noted that her father neither participated in the Mahad Satyagraha organised by Ambedkar nor inter-dining arranged by Vinayak Damodar Savarkar, although her elder sister, Shantiakka, often missed school to attend the inter-dining lured by sweet delicacies served there.

== Literary works ==
=== Aaidan ===
Aaidan, her autobiography written in Marathi has been translated into English and titled as The Weave of My Life: A Dalit Woman’s Memoirs. In her foreword to the English translation, Wandana Sonalkar writes that the title of the book The Weave is a metaphor of the writing technique employed by Pawar, "the lives of different members of her family, her husband's family, her neighbours and classmates, are woven together in a narrative that gradually reveals different aspects of the everyday life of Dalits, the manifold ways in which caste asserts itself and grinds them down"

=== Motherwit ===
MotherWit is a collection of short stories in which Urmila Pawar blends fictional and real-life elements to depict the challenges and experiences of the Dalit community.

== Awards and accolades ==
Pawar won the Laxmibai Tilak award for the best published autobiography given by the Maharashtra Sahitya Parishad (Maharashtra Literary Conference), Pune for Aaidan. Pawar rejected the award. In a letter to the Parishad, she explained that the intent to start the programme with a prayer to goddess Saraswati indicated an attempt to project symbols and metaphors of a single religion. She questioned why such ideas should be present in Marathi literature.

Pawar was also awarded the Matoshree Bhimabai Ambedkar Award by the Sambodhi Pratishthan in 2004 for her work in the fields of literature and activism. In 2018 she was honoured with the Yuvakalavahini Gopichand National Literary Award at a ceremony held at Potti Sriramulu Telugu University.

== See also ==
- Dagdu Maruti Pawar
