= National Federation of Dalit Women =

The National Federation of Dalit Women (NFDW) is a non-governmental organization dedicated to promoting the rights of Dalit women internationally. NFDW was founded by Ruth Manorama in 1995.

== History ==
The National Federation of Dalit Women (NFDW) was begun as an idea in 1993 by Ruth Manorama when she helped organize a hearing in Bangalore on the topic of violence against Dalit women. This led to NFDW being founded in 1995. Later at the World Conference on Women in Beijing, NFDW participated, with Manorama being the group's representative.

NFDW created several early goals, including creating several national and state-level committees, tracking crimes against Dalit people, creating resources and providing scholarships for Dalit women's educations. In 2001, NFDW with Manorama, participated in the World Conference Against Racism, where they "translated and discussed caste discrimination in a manner that seemed to amplify its global resonance." In 2006, NFDW, along with the National Campaign for Dalit Human Rights (NCDHR) held the first national conference on violence against Dalit women in the city of New Delhi.

== About ==
The organization is secular, democratically controlled and works on Dalit women's issues and also represents Dalit women both nationally and internationally. NFDW works with local and regional Dalit women's groups to share issues and concerns with one another. NFDW also helps women take legal action against violence and helps provide leadership opportunities.
