= Karmamela =

Marathi poet

Sant Karmamela was a 14th-century poet saint from Maharashtra. He was a son of Chokhamela and Soyarabai who belonged Mahar caste. In his Abhangs he accused God for forgetting and how his life was made miserable as a low caste. He rebelled against varna system.

There is at least one Buddhist tradition interested in Karamamela, who was a strong and bitter voice, not suffering his social status with content. Kramamela and his family followed the Bhakti movement. Their Abhangs comments on that time, on the way to meditate and God's loves for his devotee. These poems resonate with current Dalit poetry, describing criticism of society and beliefs of religion, disbelief in pure doctrine and pollution, and protest for survival.
