= Worli riots =

1974 riots in Mumbai, India

The Worli riots occurred in the chawl, or tenement, in the Worli neighborhood of Mumbai between January and April 1974. The riots began on 5 January 1974 after the police attempted to disperse a rally of the Dalit Panthers that had turned violent. Regular clashes between the Dalit Panthers, the Shiv Sena, and the police continued for several months. Six people were killed in the riots, and approximately 113 injured; widespread property damage also occurred in the tenements. The riots have been described as anti-Dalit violence by scholars.

== Background ==
A larger number of unemployed youth lived in the Worli neighborhood of Mumbai in the 1970s. These youth frequently organized themselves into gangs which included individuals from multiple caste backgrounds, brought together by their lower-class status and their shared life in the Worli chawls, or tenements. These youth were often associated with the Shiv Sena, a Hindu nationalist political party, which gave them "ideological and organisational focus", and which used them to mobilise support during elections. However, the formation of the Dalit Panthers, which drew inspiration from the Black Panthers in the United States and advocated for Dalit rights, led to Dalit youth moving towards the new organisation, leading to conflict between the two groups. Support for the Sena declined. The Sena accused the Dalit Panthers of damaging Maharashtrian unity by raising issues of caste. The Panthers stated that the Sena only represented upper-caste Hindus, and did not offer Dalits a way to overcome systemic inequality.

The Worli riots occurred during a time of dissatisfaction with the Indian National Congress government in Maharastra. This dissatisfaction resulted in political tension; for example, on 2 January 1974, various communist organisations had called for a "Maharashtra Bandh Day" ("Shut Down Maharashtra Day"); the call had the support of several opposition parties, as well as the Dalit Panthers. A by-election to the Maharashtra legislative assembly had been scheduled for January 1974. The candidate of the Congress had the support of most of the Republican Party of India, which had historically commanded substantial support among Dalits. The Dalit Panthers opposed any agreement with the Congress, and asked Dalit voters to boycott the bypoll.

== Riots ==
The riots began on 5 January 1974. The events which triggered the riots are in dispute. The violence began after speakers at a rally of the Dalit Panthers were stoned: they were accused of having made obscene statements about Hindu deities. Bhagwat Jadhav, a member of the Dalit Panthers, was killed by a grinding stone thrown at the rally. Reacting to the violence, the police attempted to disperse the crowd using tear gas and baton charges. The crowd was pushed into the close-packed slum area of the neighborhood; 70% of the inhabitants of this area were non-Dalits. Members of the Shiv Sena followed the gathering, and began to attack them; the Dalits retaliated. Dalits and non-Dalit Hindus were reported to have attacked each other with stones and glass bottles.

The violence continued the next morning; intermittent violence would continue in the Worli tenements until April 1974, and also spread to other parts of the city of Mumbai; an eyewitness stated that gangs of people threw stones at each other, often from terraces of the tenements. Electric bulbs, acid, and kerosene bombs were also thrown. Being in a numerical minority in these neighborhoods, Dalits bore the brunt of this violence. The local police supported the attacks on the Dalits; one of the Dalit men killed in the violence was the victim of police firing. A number of the eye-witnesses stated that the police sided with the Shiv Sena, and that members of the police who were not on duty were part of the Hindu mob. Six people were killed in the violence, and 113 were estimated to have been injured. The police opened fire on violence mobs on 19 occasions. 70 complexes within the Worli tenement were damaged, affecting over half of its residents.

Scholarly analysis of the 1974 riots has generally described the incidents as anti-Dalit violence. Historian Eleanor Zelliot described the riots as an attack on Dalit Buddhists by their Hindu neighbors. Scholar Jayashree Gokhale‐Turner stated that the nature of the police's response to the violence was seen as a warning to the Dalit Panthers to moderate their methods. Scholar Anupama Rao stated that the Worli were part of a systematic attempt by non-Dalit Hindus to undermine the influence of "neo-Buddhists", or Dalits who had followed B. R. Ambedkar in converting to Buddhism. Rao referred to the riots as "an important landmark in Dalit politics".

== Inquiry and aftermath ==
The Maharashtra Government ordered a judicial inquiry into the matter. The inquiry was led by S. B. Bhasme, a high court judge, and lasted until April 1974. The commission's report described the riots as a conflict between "caste Hindus and neo-Buddhists" and attributed much of the severity of the conflict to the physical proximity of Hindu and Buddhist chawls which facilitated stone throwing. Much evidence was also presented to the commission regarding partisan police behavior against Dalits, with some witnesses describing a "police riot". The report did not mention the role of the Shiv Sena as an organisation, but stated that a large number of the perpetrators of the violence were supports of the Sena.

The violence significantly lowered voter turnout among Dalit voters, and the Congress candidate lost the election to Roza Deshpande, a candidate of the Communist Party of India. The repression faced by the Dalit Panthers after the riots led to the organisation moderating its methods. The riots brought the neighborhood of Worli into national prominence. The performance of the police was criticized in the Maharashtra Legislative Assembly by a member of the legislature. The riots have been described as triggering the end of a period of unity among the Dalit Panthers; the organisation would break into two factions later in 1974. Members of the Congress party were rumoured to have attended the rally, hoping to come to an agreement with the Panthers about the election. Though the rumours were never substantiated, they were the subject of a disagreement between factions of the Panthers, which played a role in the split that followed. The riots were referred to several times in Dalit poetry from the period. In 2010, Dalit activist Namdeo Dhasal described the Worli riots as "showcasing the worst of [Indian] democracy."
