= Balajinagar =

Village in Maharashtra

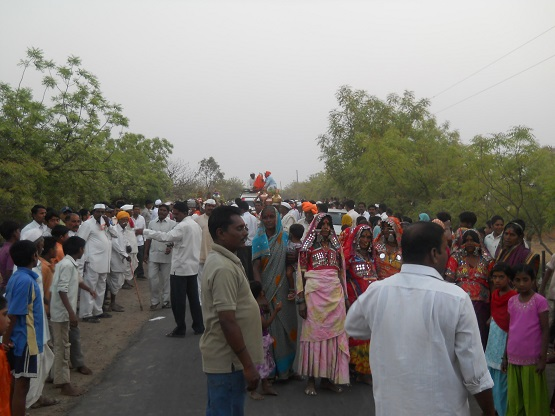
Gods rally time of villagers

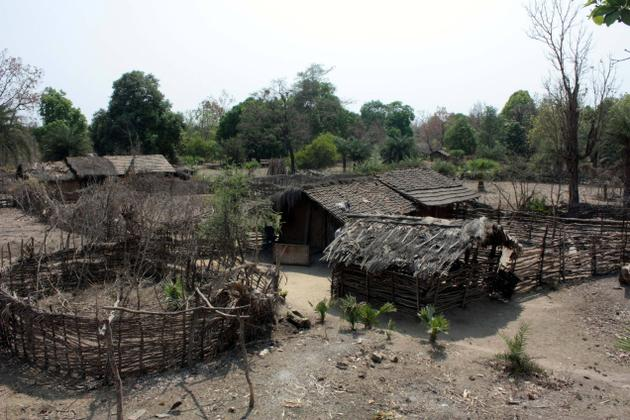
House of village (parlo tando)

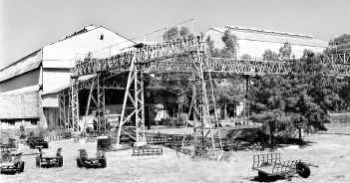
Renuka sugar karkhana balajinagar

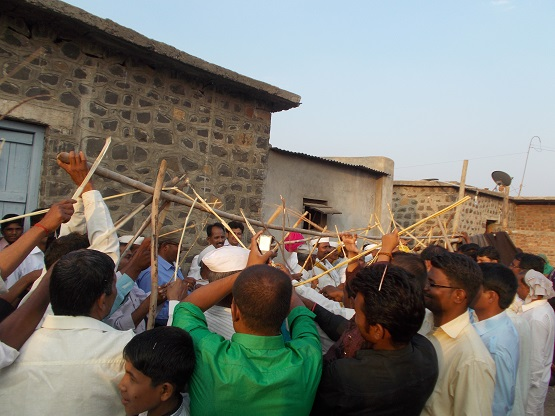
Holi festival rasam sarik sariya....

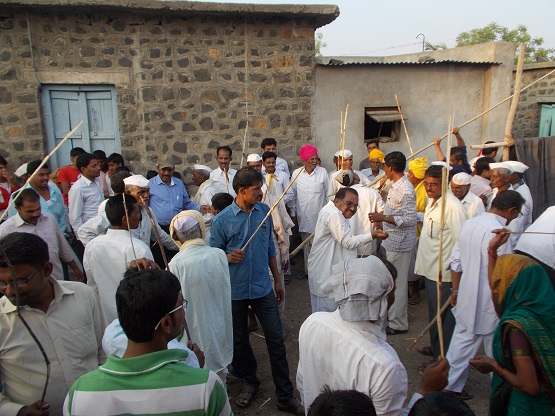
Holi festival

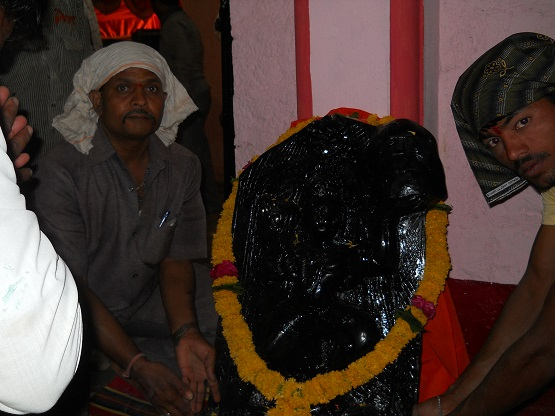
God

Balajinagar (Bantanda) is a village situated in Mangalwedha taluk, Solapur district, Maharashtra, India.
