= Ajanale =

Village in Maharashtra

Ajanale Ajnale
- Village
- Location in Maharashtra, India Ajanale (India)
- Coordinates: 17°25′36″N 075°04′15″E
- Country: India
- State: Maharashtra
- District: Solapur
- Tahsil: Sangole

Government
  - Body: Village panchayat

Population (2011)
  - Total: 4,173

Languages
  - Official: Marathi
- Time zone: UTC+5:30 (IST)
- PIN: 413308
- ISO 3166 code: IN-MH
- Vehicle registration: MH-45
- Website: maharashtra.gov.in

Ajanale is a village in the state of Maharashtra, India. Administratively it is under the Sangole Taluka of Solapur District in Maharashtra. The village is known for its export quality anar (pomegranates). 90% of its population is directly or indirectly dependent on pomegranate production. Hence annual income is very high. The village is located 15 km by road west of the town of Sangole, and 8 km by road east of the village of Bombewadi and the bridge over the Man River.

== Location ==
Ajanale is a village in the hot and arid zone of Solapur. The blazing sun and rocky land characterize the landscape of this region. Aside from thorny bushes and that occasional yellow desert flower there is very little that meets the eye on the plains that forms Solapur. Ajanale is one of the most progressive villages in Solapur, especially known for its pomegranates.

== History ==
The gram panchayat of the village Ajanale was established in 1951. Until 1972, the villagers were largely shepherds. Their main income came from an employment guarantee scheme implemented by the government. In 1972, this village was selected for the development scheme entitled ‘Krushi Pandhari’. Under this scheme, certain select villages were given aid in agriculture by helping them conserve water. This was especially needed in a drought prone region like Solapur. Under this scheme, Ajanale saw the construction of several bunds and percolation tanks. "Paani Adwaa, Paani Jirava" (stop water, help water percolate) was the slogan to promote percolation of water in this dry region. This started the process of raising the water tables in this region.

In 1997, the village received the Adarsha Gaav Puraskar (Ideal Village Award). The criteria for the award were: an addiction free environment, clean village with appropriate water facilities for drinking as well as other uses, availability of basic primary health care facilities, implementation of most applicable government schemes, sophisticated farming practices, among others.

There are no rivers in Ajanale. There are some tributary streams that flow south to the Man River, but these only have water during the monsoon season. Percolation tanks provide some water, but not enough to ensure the survival and quality fruiting of pomegranate trees using traditional irrigation techniques. The water table remains as low as 500 – 550 feet, due to ground water pumping from bore wells dug in several places. However, the introduction of the efficient technology of drip irrigation changed the scope of farmers' cultivation. Farmers began experimenting with pomegranate installed drip irrigation systems in the early 1980s. Between 1984 and 94, 50% of the farming population started cultivating pomegranates. Today every family that has land cultivates pomegranates. Those without land work as labourers in pomegranate orchards. So the entire village is dependent on the pomegranate for their livelihood. In short, pomegranates and adequate water management has led this village to prosperity.

== Economy ==
Ajanale has a farming economy, traditional crops include Pomegranate, Jawar. Farmers rely on rain water for farming needs. Pomegranates and effective water management has made the farmers of Ajanale very rich. Each has a house in his own farm. Although water to the household is less, there is always water on the farm. The yield of pomegranates is very high. The quality too is superior. This is the reason why now they do not have to send their produce elsewhere, but the markets themselves come here. They get excellent rates for their produce from the comforts of their own farm house. In fact, marketing of pomegranate has become such a good business that several youth in the village have entered it. They not only produce pomegranates but also deal with markets outside and sell produce from several farmers in the village to urban markets. As business grows so does the employment opportunity within the village. Hence, landed and landless, alike, are rising up the socio-economic ladder gradually but definitively. A few farmers from this village were invited to make a presentation on development of horticulture at the World Bank conference held in Pune in 2010. And the farmers agree that prosperity is possible only because of effective water management and the drip irrigation systems. It is important to have SCIENTIFIC/ Geological approach for solving the water problem in the area. The topographic feature is suitable for implementation of Integrated Watershed Development Programme. Rain water harvesting is less in area. The dry or failed bore wells can be used as 'RECHARGE SHAFTS' where roof water can be collected in these dry bores which will help recharging deeper water zones. The upper zones of water is limited to about 280 feet, but farmers take deeper bore wells that causes leakage of upper zone water into lower dry red bed 'geru' zones. If farmers collectively decide not to exceed this depth, it will solve the problem to some extent and save their money that usually goes waste in taking deeper bore wells, costly/ high Hp pumps & the heavy cost on electricity bills.

== Demographics ==
In the 2001 India census, the village of Ajanale had 3,331 inhabitants, with 1,701 or 51.1% male and 1,630 or 48.9% female. The sex-ratio was 958 females per thousand males.

In the 2011 census, the village of Ajanale had 4,173 inhabitants.

== Administration ==
Ajanale has a village gram panchayat for day-to-day administration. The gram panchayat for the village Ajanale was established in 1951.

Ajanale has co-operative banks, agricultural credit societies, non-agricultural credit societies and other credit societies are present within the village.

== Education Facilities ==
Ajanale has two primary schools and one higher-secondary school within the village. There is also a government funded childcare and mother-care center (Anganwadi) within the village as part of the Integrated Child Development Services program started by the Indian government to combat child hunger and malnutrition in 1975.

== Transport ==
=== Rail ===
Ajanale has no railway station of its own, the closest railway station is Sangole.

=== Road ===
Ajanale is connected by the State Transport Buses that ply between Sangole and Atpadi.
