= Damaji =

Marathi saint from 15th-century India

Damaji, also known as Damaji Pant (Damajipant - Pant indicates ministership or high scholarship), Sant Damaji and Bhakta Damaji, was a 15th-century Marathi saint (sant) or bhakta ("devotee"), venerated by the Varkari sect of Hinduism. He was the Kamavisdar (main revenue official) of Mangalvedha under the Bahamani king of Bidar. He is described as a devotee of the god Vithoba - the patron deity of the Varkari sect. He distributed grain from the royal granaries to the people in famine. Vithoba is said to have come as an outcaste with a bag of gold to pay for the grain and rescue Damaji. The famine of 1460 is known as Damaji Pant's famine in the Deccan region in honour of Damaji's generosity in the famine.

== Life ==
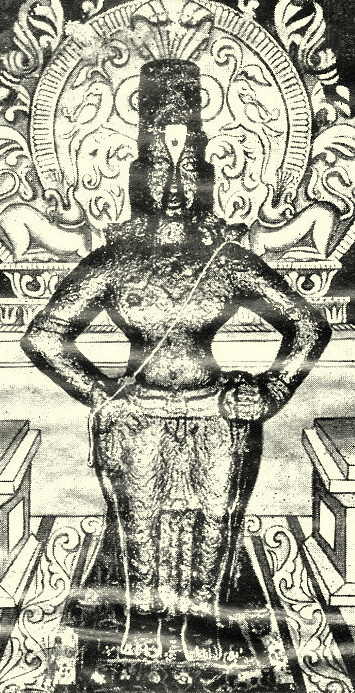
Vithoba, the patron god of Damaji

Damaji's chief hagiographical account is found in the Bhaktavijaya by Mahipati (1715 - 1790). Damaji was the revenue official of the Muslim king (sultan/ badshah) of Bidar (see Bahmani Sultanate). He is described as "generous, wise and brave". He lived in Mangalvedhe, near Pandharpur – where the chief temple of Vithoba stands. He was in charge of the revenue of the district and the keeper of the royal grain storehouses.

A great famine struck the region, with many households starving. A Brahmin (the priest caste) from Pandharpur came begging for food at Damaji's house, whereupon Damaji Pant Deshpande invited him home and served him dinner. The Brahmin breaks down in tears seeing the food and talks about the suffering of his starving family, which he left behind at Pandharpur. Damaji promises to send food for the family too, and sends servants with grain to Pandharpur.

Damaji's servants bring two loads of grain to the Brahmin's family in Pandharpur, but as they approached, the people of the famine-hit town attacked in desperation, looting the servants and stealing away the grain. A delegation of other Brahmins from Pandharpur approached Damaji and beseeched him to solve their problem of hunger, knowing of his wealth and generosity.

Damaji realised that by opening up the royal granaries, numerous people could be saved; entire towns, in fact. However, if the Sultan found what he had done, he would most certainly be executed.

But putting the well-being of the impoverished peasants before his own life, Damaji opened up the warehouses of grain to the public, and distributed all the grain, giving equally regardless of caste and class, seeing only hungry, starving fellows.

An evil Brahmin muzumdar (deputy revenue collector) shot off a letter to the sultan in Bidar informing him of the plunder of the royal grain. The sultan was enraged as to how Damaji had distributed away the grain without prior notice or permission. He sent soldiers to recover money for the grain from Damaji or bring Damaji to Bidar for decapitation if he failed to pay.

Receiving the royal summons, Damaji left for Bidar to visit the sultan, only requesting the soldiers for a halt in Pandharpur. He visited Vithoba's temple and worships the god. He admits to Vithoba that he had done the sultan wrong in distributing his grain, but that he felt to remorse for the good deed. He also mentioned that his life had already been completed anyhow, by worshipping Vitthala, and that he was now ready to face the consequences of his actions, even if shameful the consequences may be.

Vithoba disguised himself as a Mahar (outcaste) and reached the sultan's court in Bidar. Vithoba introduced himself as a child who was brought up in Damaji's house and claims to work as his servant back home. He presented the minister a letter in Damaji's handwriting, with the letter reading how Damaji had sold the grain for high prices when food was scarce, therefore increasing the earnings of the sultan; after all, food would grow every year, but such an opportunity was rare. Vithoba presented the king a small bag of gold, but when the bag was opened, "countless coins flowed out of it". The Sultan was pleased and calmed, and permitted Vithoba to leave with many gifts.

The next day, Damaji arrived at the royal court. The sultan embraced him warmly, and told about his Mahar messenger.

Damaji, at first astonished, realised that it was none but Vithoba who had taken the form of a Mahar to save the hopeless Pant, who had had no other help. He then sings a panegyric in honour of the god. The sultan is astonished and praises Damaji, due to whom, the sultan had met God himself.

Damaji asks permission to leave the sultan's service, the sultan consents saying that God was now Damaji's debtor. Damaji settles in Pandharpur with his family and serves the god and sings kirtans in his honour.

== Dating and historicity ==
While some scholars had dismissed Damaji as a legendary figure earlier, a discovery of an undated mahajar (testimonial of right) document is interpreted by historian V.K. Rajwade to be historical evidence for Damaji. The first part of the document states which kind of animal should be ridden by a bridegroom of a particular caste in his marriage procession. The second part deals with what a Mahar should get from different castes. The document mentions: "By order of the Badshah (king of Bidar) and his seal and in the handwriting of Damaji Pant".

The famine of 1460 is called "Damaji Pant's famine" in the Deccan region, as it is believed to the famine when Damaji distributed the grain. The famine was a result of failure of the monsoon and widespread across Western India. Others relate Damaji to the Durga Devi famine (1396–1408) or the famine from 1468 to 1475.

== Remembrance ==
Apart from being formally included in the list of Sants (saints) in the Bhaktavijaya, the abhangas of Eknath and Tukaram accord him sainthood and mention him with other saints. Eknath's abhanga praises Vithoba who came a Mahar to rescue Damaji.

Besides naming the 1460 famine on him, his contributions were also alluded to in the Great Famine of 1876–78. Mr. Grant, the collector of Solapur, was called Damaji Pant for his efforts to remedy the famine.

A temple in his honour stands in his home town at Mangalvedha.
