= Malika Amar Sheikh =

Marathi writer

- Born: 16 February 1957 (age 69)
- Occupations: Writer, Political Activist
- Political party: Dalit Panthers
- Spouse: Namdeo Dhasal
- Father: Shahir Amar Sheikh

Malika Amar Sheikh or Malika Namdeo Dhasal (born 16 February 1957) is a Marathi writer and political activist from Maharashtra, India. She is the president of the Dalit Panthers party.

== Biography ==
Malika Amar Sheikh was born on 16 February 1957 to Shahir Amar Sheikh. She married Dalit poet, and co-founder of the Dalit Panthers, Namdeo Dhasal. After the death of her husband, she was elected the president of the party and led it during Maharashtra civic bodies elections in 2017.

== Books ==
- Valucha Priyakar (A Lover Made of Sand)
- Mahanagar (Metropolitan City)
- Deharutu (The Season of Body)
- Mala Udhvasta Whaychay (I Want to Get Ruined) (Autobiography)
- Handle With Care
- Ek Hota Undir (Story Of A Rat)
- Koham Koham (Who Am I?)

=== Anthologies ===
- Live Update: An Anthology of Recent Marathi Poetry, edited and translated by Sachin Ketkar, Mumbai: Poetrywala, 2005, ISBN 81-89621-00-9
- The Tree of Tongues — An Anthology of Modern Indian Poetry, edited by E. V. Ramakrishnan. Indian Institute of Advanced Studies, Shimla.
