= Raja Dhale =

Indian politician and writer (1940–2019)

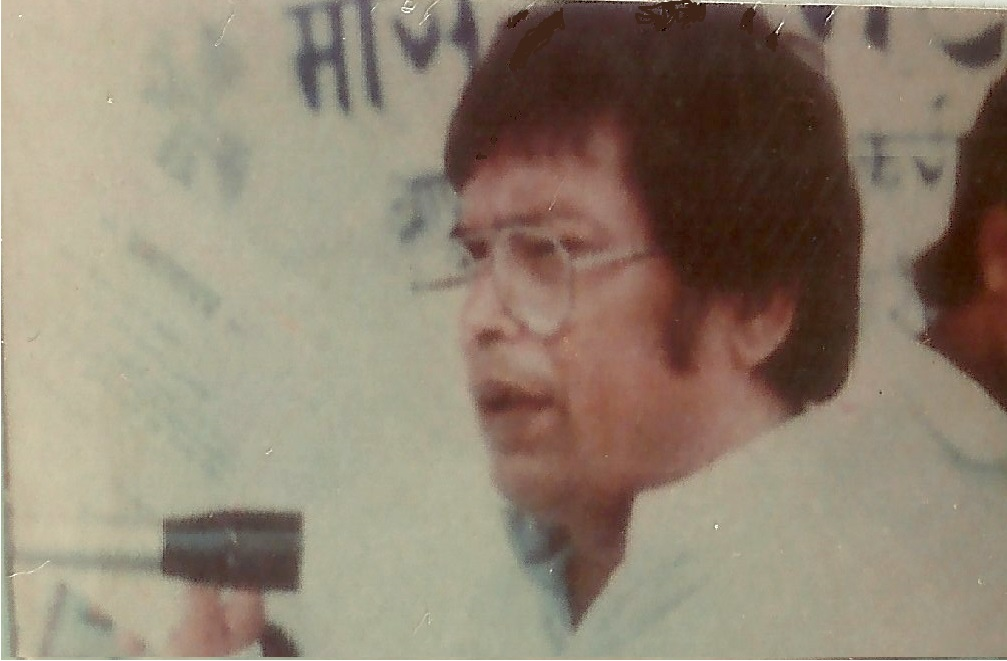
- Political activist, social reformer and Dalit Panthers member Raja Dhale

Personal details
- Born: 30 September 1940 Maharashtra
- Died: 16 July 2019 (aged 78) Mumbai, Maharashtra
- Party: Republican Party of India; Bharipa Bahujan Mahasangh
- Spouse: Deexa Dhale
- Children: Gatha Dhale

Rajaram Piraji Dhale (30 September 1940 – 16 July 2019), commonly referred to as Raja Dhale, was an Indian writer, artist and activist for Dalit rights. In April 1972, he, along with Namdeo Dhasal and J. V. Pawar, founded the Dalit Panthers, an organization dedicated to fighting for the rights of the Dalit community. Dhale was a veteran Ambedkarite and Buddhist.

== Career ==
Dhale was a member of the Republican Party of India and led the Raja Dhale faction, after a split in the party. Dhale was a candidate in the 1999 parliament election from the Mumbai North Central constituency on a Bharipa Bahujan Mahasangha (BBM) ticket, and 2004 parliament elections from Mumbai North East constituency, again on a BBM ticket.

== Notable works ==
- Dalit Pantherchi Sansthapana: Vastusthiti Ani Viparyas
- Arun Kolhatkarchi Gacchi: Ek Nirupan
