= Ganeshwadi, Mangalwedha =

Village in Maharashtra, India

Ganeshwadi
- Village
- Location of Ganeshwadi on the map of Maharashtra Location of Ganeshwadi on the map of India
- Coordinates: 17.481101°N 75.371162°E
- Country: India
- State: Maharashtra
- District: Solapur
- Taluka: Mangalwedha

Government
  - Type: Panchayati Raj system
  - Body: Grampanchayat

Population (2011)
  - Total: 1,401

Languages
  - Official: Marathi
- Time zone: UTC+5:30 (IST)
- PIN: 413305
- STD Code: 02188
- Vehicle registration: MH13
- Lok Sabha: solapur Lok Sabha constituency
- Vidhan Sabha: Pandharpur Assembly constituency

Ganeshwadi is a small village located in Mangalwedha taluka of Solapur district in the state of Maharashtra, in India.

== Geography ==
This Village belongs to the Pune Division. It is located 66 km towards west from District headquarter Solapur. Mangalwedha, Sangola and Pandharpur are the nearby Cities to Ganeshwadi. National Highway 166 (NH 166) pass through this Village.

== Demographics ==
According to the 2011 Census total population of ganeshwadi is 1401, of which 746 are males while 655 are females.

== Education system ==
There are two schools in Ganeshwadi. Zilla Parishad Primary School is for 1st to 7th class and SHRI GANESH VIDYALAYA GANESHWADI is a high school for 8th to 10th class.

== Economy ==
The main profession of the people in Ganeshwadi is agriculture and animal husbandry so the economy depends on the Monsoon.

== Transport ==
Ganeshwadi Village is connected by road to other cities. Buses of Maharashtra State Road Transport Corporation are available from this village.
