= Sangola Municipal Council =

Type
- Type: Municipal Council of the Sangola

Leadership
- Mayor: Ananda Gorakh Mane, Shivsena
- Seats: 23+ President

Elections
- Last election: 21-Dec-2025

Website
- http://sangolamahaulb.maharashtra.gov.in/

The Sangola Nagar Palika is the governing body of the city of Sangola in Solapur district in the Maharashtra, India. Members from the state's leading various political parties hold elected offices in the corporation. Sangola Nagar Palika is located in Sangola.

== Corporation Election ==
=== Political Performance in Election 2025 ===
S.No.	Party name	Party flag or symbol	Number of Corporators
01	Shiv Sena (SS)		15
02	Bharatiya Janata Party (BJP)		4
03	Peasants and Workers Party of India(PWP)		3
04	Dipak Aaba Salunkhe Patil		1

== President election ==
The election for the President of the Sangola Nagar Parishad was held as part of the 2025 municipal elections. The results were declared after the completion of vote counting.

Candidate	Party	Votes	Vote share (%)
MANE ANANDA GORAKH	Shiv Sena	13,668	52.20
Bankar Maruti Tulshiram	Bharatiya Janata Party	8,528	32.57
ZAPKE VISHWESH PRABUDDHACHANDRA	Independent	2,775	10.59
Bhakare Bapusaheb Bhagawan	Independent	351	1.34
Ingole Rahul Shrimant	Independent	209	0.80
NAGANE SWAPNIL VISHWAMBHAR	Independent	116	0.44
MULANI SHOUKAT ABDUL	Independent	121	0.46
CHAVAN CHANDRAKANT HANMANT	Independent	97	0.37
KHATIB MOHASIN ILAHI	Independent	74	0.28
MANDALE UMESH DNYANU	Independent	68	0.26
RAUT MOHAN VISHNU	Independent	42	0.16
NOTA	—	133	0.51
Total valid votes		26,182	100.00

Result: MANE ANANDA GORAKH (Shiv Sena) was elected as President of the Sangola Nagar Parishad.

== Ward-wise results ==
=== Ward No. 1 ===
Candidate	Party	Votes	Vote share (%)
MADANE RAMCHANDRA BAPU	Shiv Sena	1,175	52.24
SHINGADE NAVANATH MOHAN	Independent	963	42.81
BABAR MOHAN GANPAT	Independent	33	1.47
Gadhire Bharat Digambar	Independent	20	0.89
Ingole Rahul Shrimant	Independent	17	0.76
NOTA	—	41	1.82
Total		2,249	100

Result: MADANE RAMCHANDRA BAPU (Shiv Sena) elected.

=== Ward No. 2 ===
==== Seat A ====
Candidate	Party	Votes	Vote share (%)
DHANVAJIR PRASHANT BABAN	Shiv Sena	1,660	61.50
BANSODE CHANCHAL SARJERAO	Independent	532	19.71
RANDIVE VINOD POPAT	Independent	434	16.08
BANSODE MAHADEV VASANT	Bahujan Samaj Party	30	1.11
NOTA	—	43	1.59
Total		2,699	100

Result: DHANVAJIR PRASHANT BABAN (Shiv Sena) elected.

==== Seat B ====
Candidate	Party	Votes	Vote share (%)
Sawant Vaishali Satish	Shiv Sena	1,507	55.83
DESHMUKH PRIYANKA PANDURANG	Independent	579	21.45
DESHMUKH SANGITA DATTATRAY	Independent	467	17.30
NADAF PAKIJA RUSTUM	Independent	52	1.93
INGOLE DEEPALI PRAVIN	Independent	41	1.52
NOTA	—	53	1.96
Total		2,699	100

Result: Sawant Vaishali Satish (Shiv Sena) elected.

=== Ward No. 3 ===
==== Seat A ====
Candidate	Party	Votes	Vote share (%)
BANSODE GODABAI BHARAT	Shiv Sena	826	45.76
BANSODE KAVITA TUKARAM	Independent	464	25.70
KHADTARE SAMRUDDHI JAYSING	Independent	384	21.27
THOKALE SHITAL VIKAS	Bahujan Samaj Party	114	6.32
NOTA	—	17	0.94
Total		1,805	100

Result: BANSODE GODABAI BHARAT (Shiv Sena) elected.

==== Seat B ====
Candidate	Party	Votes	Vote share (%)
PATIL ARUN VILAS	Shiv Sena	490	27.14
BANSODE VIJAY TANAJI	Independent	465	25.76
PATIL ARUN SADASHIV	Independent	462	25.59
BANSODE KUNDAN FULCHAND	Bahujan Samaj Party	276	15.29
PAWAR SACHIN SHANKAR	Independent	101	5.60
NOTA	—	11	0.61
Total		1,805	100

Result: PATIL ARUN VILAS (Shiv Sena) elected.

=== Ward No. 4 ===
==== Seat A ====
Candidate	Party	Votes	Vote share (%)
YAWALKAR ASHADEVI SOMESHWAR	Shiv Sena	1,600	61.56
BAGWAN BISMILLA SHABBIR	Independent	536	20.62
ANKALGI SWATI MAKARAND	Independent	429	16.50
NOTA	—	34	1.31
Total		2,599	100

Result: YAWALKAR ASHADEVI SOMESHWAR (Shiv Sena) elected.

==== Seat B ====
Candidate	Party	Votes	Vote share (%)
TELI DNYANESHWAR BALKRUSHNA	Shiv Sena	1,237	47.59
TAMBOLI DILAVAR HUSAIN	Independent	677	26.04
HONRAO SUHAS SUDHAKAR	Independent	522	20.08
RAUT MAHESH SUBHASH	Independent	73	2.81
Ingole Santosh Uddhav	Independent	33	1.27
BABAR VINOD BABURAO	Independent	23	0.88
KIRAN NARAYAN MALAWE	Independent	11	0.42
NOTA	—	23	0.88
Total		2,599	100

Result: teli dnyaneshwar balkrushna (Shiv Sena) elected.

=== Ward No. 5 ===
==== Seat A ====
Candidate	Party	Votes	Vote share (%)
GAVADE KASHILING DAGADU	Shiv Sena	1,272	53.55
JADHAV YASH SIDDHESHWAR	Independent	986	41.51
NAGANE SWAPNIL VISHWAMBHAR	Independent	59	2.48
SHINDE SURAJ BABAN	Independent	30	1.26
NOTA	—	28	1.18
Total		2,375	100

Result: GAVADE KASHILING DAGADU (Shiv Sena) elected.

==== Seat B ====
Candidate	Party	Votes	Vote share (%)
METAKARI CHHAYA SURYAKANT	Shiv Sena	1,418	59.70
MANE POOJA DADASO	Independent	833	35.07
Gadhire Nanda Bharat	Independent	66	2.78
NOTA	—	58	2.44
Total		2,375	100

Result: METAKARI CHHAYA SURYAKANT (Shiv Sena) elected.

=== Ward No. 6 ===
==== Seat A ====
Candidate	Party	Votes	Vote share (%)
SARGAR SIMA SAMADHAN	Shiv Sena	1,177	49.97
Erande Tanuja Balasaheb	Independent	1,089	46.24
MUJAVAR MEHEJBEEN SHAKIL	Independent	34	1.44
NOTA	—	55	2.34
Total valid votes		2,355	100.00

Result: SARGAR SIMA SAMADHAN (Shiv Sena) was elected from Ward No. 6 (Seat A).

==== Seat B ====
Candidate	Party	Votes	Vote share (%)
RAUT CHAITANYA DNYANU	Shiv Sena	1,198	50.87
RAUT VISHVANATH SAVATA	Independent	961	40.80
BHOSALE SIDDHANATH JAGANNATH	Independent	66	2.80
METKARI POPAT MADHUKAR	Independent	53	2.25
KORE GOVIND AMBADAS	Independent	42	1.78
NOTA	—	35	1.49
Total valid votes		2,355	100.00

Result: RAUT CHAITANYA DNYANU (Shiv Sena) was elected from Ward No. 6 (Seat B).

=== Ward No. 7 ===
==== Seat A ====
Candidate	Party	Votes	Vote share (%)
BANKAR GANESH SHIVAJI	Independent	1,101	51.86
SULE SUNIL CHANDRAKANT	Shiv Sena	577	27.17
MHAMANE KISHOR KRUSHNA	Independent	370	17.42
MALAWE KIRAN NARAYAN	Independent	22	1.04
RAUT MOHAN VISHNU	Independent	21	0.99
NOTA	—	32	1.51
Total valid votes		2,123	100.00

Result: BANKAR GANESH SHIVAJI (Independent) was elected from Ward No. 7 (Seat A).

==== Seat B ====
Candidate	Party	Votes	Vote share (%)
Phule Shobha Nivrutti	Independent	926	43.61
SAVANT BHAGYAVATI SHAHAJI	Shiv Sena	567	26.70
PAWAR SUCHITA AMOL	Independent	533	25.10
Adlinge Sharada Hemant	Independent	45	2.12
NOTA	—	52	2.45
Total valid votes		2,123	100.00

Result: Phule Shobha Nivrutti (Independent) was elected from Ward No. 7 (Seat B).

=== Ward No. 8 ===
==== Seat A ====
Candidate	Party	Votes	Vote share (%)
SABALE SHRADDHA RAVIPRAKASH	Independent	1,016	47.99
LADE SHITAL VILAS	Shiv Sena	1,003	47.37
Gadhire Nanda Bharat	Independent	34	1.61
Thokale Shital Vikas	Bahujan Samaj Party	20	0.94
NOTA	—	44	2.08
Total valid votes		2,117	100.00

Result: SABALE SHRADDHA RAVIPRAKASH (Independent) was elected from Ward No. 8 (Seat A).

==== Seat B ====
Candidate	Party	Votes	Vote share (%)
JADHAV RAMESH PANDURANG	Independent	1,257	59.37
DESHMUKH SHOBHA SANJAY	Shiv Sena	781	36.89
JADHAV DILIP BABU	Independent	47	2.22
BANSODE KIRAN MOHAN	Bahujan Samaj Party	12	0.57
NOTA	—	20	0.94
Total valid votes		2,117	100.00

Result: JADHAV RAMESH PANDURANG (Independent) was elected from Ward No. 8 (Seat B).

=== Ward No. 9 ===
==== Seat A ====
Candidate	Party	Votes	Vote share (%)
MUJAWAR JUBER IQBAL	Independent	1,152	47.17
Daunde Anand Dattatraya	Shiv Sena	919	37.63
DHOLE UTTAM SOMNATH	Independent	210	8.60
KHATIB MOHASIN ILAHI	Independent	118	4.83
BABAR VINOD BABURAO	Independent	21	0.86
NOTA	—	22	0.90
Total valid votes		2,442	100.00

Result: MUJAWAR JUBER IQBAL (Independent) was elected from Ward No. 9 (Seat A).

==== Seat B ====
Candidate	Party	Votes	Vote share (%)
DOUNDE DIVYANI SOURABH	Independent	1,160	47.50
SHAIKH SANA TOHID	Shiv Sena	876	35.87
DHANAKE RAJNANDINI RAKESH	Independent	257	10.52
Pathan Shamshad Asgar	Independent	81	3.32
KHATIB RESHMA NISAR	Independent	35	1.43
NOTA	—	33	1.35
Total valid votes		2,442	100.00

Result: DOUNDE DIVYANI SOURABH (Independent) was elected from Ward No. 9 (Seat B).

=== Ward No. 10 ===
==== Seat A ====
Candidate	Party	Votes	Vote share (%)
ZAPAKE VAISHALI SIDHARTH	Independent	1,170	49.59
MANERI MALIKA NOUSHAD	Shiv Sena	931	39.46
MANERI HINA FIROJ	Independent	171	7.25
DHOLE SWATI KASHINATH	Independent	27	1.14
Kamalapurkar Priya Manas	Independent	20	0.85
NOTA	—	40	1.70
Total valid votes		2,359	100.00

Result: ZAPAKE VAISHALI SIDHARTH (Independent) was elected from Ward No. 10 (Seat A).

==== Seat B ====
Candidate	Party	Votes	Vote share (%)
PATIL VIVEK DILIP	Shiv Sena	1,085	45.99
PATIL SAMEER SAHEBRAO	Independent	804	34.08
MAHIMAKAR SANTOSH MADHUKAR	Independent	255	10.80
LAULKAR AMOL MOHAN	Independent	134	5.68
PATANE MAHALING MAHADEV	Independent	32	1.36
CHAVAN CHANDRAKANT HANMANT	Independent	19	0.81
KALE ANIKET BAPURAO	Independent	13	0.55
LOKHANDE DEVRAJ SUBHASH	Independent	6	0.25
NOTA	—	11	0.47
Total valid votes		2,359	100.00

Result: PATIL VIVEK DILIP (Shiv Sena) was elected from Ward No. 10 (Seat B).

=== Ward No. 11 ===
==== Seat B ====
Candidate	Party	Votes	Vote share (%)
KEDAR ANITA NILESH	Shiv Sena	1,812	59.23
CHAVAN INDUMATI ASHOK	Independent	1,179	38.54
NOTA	—	68	2.22
Total valid votes		3,059	100.00

Result: KEDAR ANITA NILESH (Shiv Sena) was elected from Ward No. 11 (Seat B).

==== Seat C ====
Candidate	Party	Votes	Vote share (%)
Ingole Nitin Vitthal	Shiv Sena	1,861	60.83
KHANDAGALE UNMESH LAXMANRAO	Independent	1,144	37.39
NOTA	—	54	1.77
Total valid votes		3,059	100.00

Result: Ingole Nitin Vitthal (Shiv Sena) was elected from Ward No. 11 (Seat C).

=== List of winning candidates (Mayor) ===
Ward No.	Corporator Name	Party name	Symbol
-	Rani Mane		
