= Bhalwani (Solapur district) =

Village in Maharashtra

- village
- Location in Maharashtra, India Bhalwani (India)
- Country: India
- State: Maharashtra
- District: Solapur district

Languages
  - Official: Marathi
- Time zone: UTC+5:30 (IST)

Bhalwani is a village in the Mangalvedha taluka of Solapur district in Maharashtra state, India.

Bhalwani was one of 10 villages of the Mangalvedha taluka where all voters boycotted the 2009 Indian general election polls. They did so to protest the lack of action by elected officials in resolving problems with water supply.

== Demographics ==
Covering 1,509 hectares (3,730 acres) and comprising 463 households at the time of the 2011 census of India, Bhalwani had a population of 2163. There were 1119 males and 1044 females, with 291 people being aged six or younger.
