= Dagdi Jowar of Jalna =

Type of Sorghum variety from Maharashtra, India

Dagdi Jowar of Jalna (दगडी ज्वारी)
- Geographical indication
- Description: Dagdi Jowar of Jalna is a Sorghum variety cultivated in Maharashtra
- Type: Sorghum
- Area: Jalna district
- Country: India
- Registered: 30 March 2024
- Official website: ipindia.gov.in

Dagdi Jowar of Jalna is a variety of sorghum cultivated in the Indian state of Maharashtra. Dagdi jowar is a variety of grain and widely cultivated crop in the Jalna district.

Under its Geographical Indication tag, it is referred to as "Dagdi Jowar of Jalna".

== Name ==
Dagdi Jowar of Jalna is a prized crop in Jalna and so named after it. The name "Dagdi Jowar" originates from the word "Dagdi" which means stone-like in the local state language of Marathi, referring to the varying pod sizes of the crop. Unlike stones, which are uniform in size, the pods of this crop come in different sizes, with some smaller and some larger. This characteristic led to the crop being named "Dagdi Jowar". Locally it is known as "Dagdi Jwari".

== Description ==
Dagdi Jowar, also known as Sorghum bicolor, is a type of millet with grain sizes ranging from 2 to 4 mm in diameter and reddish-white in color. The crop is used for various purposes, including food, animal feed, ethanol production, and making corn brooms.

In Jalna district, a unique variety of Dagdi Jowar is cultivated, characterized by an inverted grain holding husk. This crop has been grown for generations and serves as food and fodder. Locals make bhakri from Dagdi Jowar flour, mixing it with hot water and flattening it by hand.

== Geographical indication ==
It was awarded the Geographical Indication (GI) status tag from the Geographical Indications Registry, under the Union Government of India, on 30 March 2024 and is valid until 28 August 2032.

Jai Kisan Shetkari Gat Matrewadi from Badnapur, proposed the GI registration of Dagdi Jowar of Jalna. After filing the application in August 2022, the jowar was granted the GI tag in 2024 by the Geographical Indication Registry in Chennai, making the name "Dagdi Jowar of Jalna" exclusive to the jowar crop grown in the region. It thus became the second jowar variety from Maharashtra after Mangalwedha jowar and the 52nd type of goods from Maharashtra to earn the GI tag.

The GI tag protects the jowar from illegal selling and marketing, and gives it legal protection and a unique identity.

== See also ==
- Mangalwedha jowar
