= Kagasht =

Village in Maharashtra, India

- Village
- Location in Maharashtra, India Kagasht (India)
- Coordinates: 17.4032948°N 75.5567821°E
- Country: India
- State: Maharashtra
- District: Solapur

Government
  - Type: Gram Panchayat

Population (2011)
  - Total: 2,000

Languages
  - Official: Marathi; Kannada
- Time zone: UTC+5:30 (IST)
- PIN: 413319
- Telephone code: 02188
- Vehicle registration: MH-13
- Nearest city: Mangalwedha
- Lok Sabha Constituency: Solapur
- Vidhan Sabha Constituency: Madha

Kagasht is a village in Mangalwedha Taluka in Solapur District of Maharashtra State, in India. It is part of the Paschim Maharashtra region's Pune Division. It is located 60 kilometers west from Solapur.

== Language ==
People in this village speak Marathi and Kannad language.

== Grampanchyat ==
Kagasht has an active Gram panchayat which known as Local Government.

== Geography ==
It has average elevation of 499 meters from the sea level. The Kagasht Pin code is 413319 and its postal head office is Marwade. Kagasht is surrounded by Pandharpur Taluka towards North, Sangola Taluka towards west, Mohol Taluka towards North, South Solapur Taluka towards East. Mangalvedhe, Pandharpur, Sangole, Solapur are the nearby Cities to Kagasht.

== Demographics ==
As of 2011 Census, Kagasht had a population of 2,000. Kagast's zipcode is 413319. Telephone area code is 02188.

== Educational institutions ==
Kagast has a Marathi medium school established in 1960 and has educational facilities up to 4th grade for Kagasht and nearby villages Student.

== Occupations and key activities ==
The dominant occupation in the village is farming. The area is bestowed with rich black soil and uses advanced irrigation techniques. Cotton, wheat, groundnuts, jowar, bajra, dadar and vegetables are the main crop products of the village. Other people have opted for professions such as dairy farming or operation of restaurants, retail stores, garages, etc.

== Cultural activities ==
Cultural activities are a core attribute of Kagast. Shiv Jayanti, Ganesh Chaturthi, Krishna Jamanshtami, Navratri, Hanuman Jayanti, Ram Navami, Makar Sankranti, Gudhi Padwa, Akshay Tritya (Aakhaji), Pola, Dasra, Holi, and Diwali are the main festivals celebrated together in Kagast.

== Medical facilities ==
Kagast has a Sub-Primary Health Center (PHC) managed by government. Most of the people go to PHC for basic treatment of common diseases and vaccination of their children.

== Industry ==
There is one corporate sugar factory near Kagasht, named "Fabtech Sugar Factory"

== Rail connectivity ==
There is no railway station near to Kagasht in less than 10 km. however Solapur Railway Station is major railway station 56 km near to Kagasht

== External references ==
- Kagasht Info
- Population & Literacy Info of Kagasht
- Kagasht Village Info
