= Mahar =

Indian caste mostly in Maharashtra

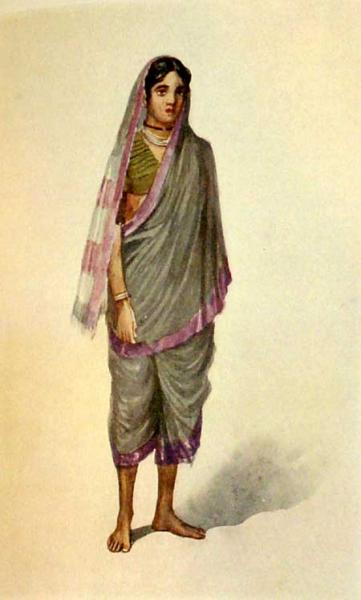
- "A Mahar woman", a watercolour by M. V. Dhurandhar, 1928

Total population
- 10 million

Regions with significant populations
- Maharashtra: 8,006,060
- Madhya Pradesh: 819,416
- Chhattisgarh: 245,220
- Karnataka: 66,068
- West Bengal: 34,793 (Note: The Mahar population in West Bengal, specifically in Jhargram, West Medinipur and Bankura district might be erroneous entry in 2011 and its four previous decadal census by a section of Pastoral society, As their Historical population was 573, 590, N/A, 1666, 6017, 4206, 6760, 12221, 17706, 23630, 28419 and 34,793 in 1901, 1911, 1921, 1931, 1941, 1951, 1961, 1971, 1981, 1991, 2001 and in 2011, subsequently. The district-wise distribution of the Mahar community as of the 1951 census was Midnapur (1,487), Birbhum (840), Burdwan (487), Malda (302), West Dinajpur (243), Jalpaiguri (221), Calcutta (177), Bankura (141), 24 Parganas (108), Murshidabad (81), Hooghly (61), Cooch Behar (33), Howrah (19), Darjeeling (3), and Nadia (1). However the actual Mahar population were came to West Bengal from various part of Maharashtra during early 20th century to work in railway workshop and colonies. Nowadays their population thinly scattered all over the state, but mostly in municipal areas. They possess Buddhism except a section of Mahar in Malda district, who are Hindu by religion. By social structure they are divided into exogamous division by their surname, such as Hogragorhe, Meshram, Madaom and Shendey. The marriage rituals are performed with the help of Buddhist priest (vikkhuk), the birth pollution is observed until six days but don't conduct naming ceremony and ten day mourning are observed after cremation.)
- Gujarat: 28,417
- Odisha: 21,304
- Andhra Pradesh (including Telangana): 12,872
- Goa: 8,536
- Rajasthan: 1,980
- Assam: 1,822
- Dadra and Nagar Haveli: 224
- Daman and Diu: 110

Languages
- Marathi, Konkani, Varhadi dialect, Ahirani, Hindi, Chhattisgarhi, English

Religion
- Majority: Buddhist; Minority: Hinduism • Sikhism • Christianity • Islam

Mahar is an Indian caste found largely in the state of Maharashtra and neighbouring areas. As of 2017 the Mahar caste is designated as a Scheduled Caste in 16 Indian states. Most of the Mahar community followed B. R. Ambedkar in converting to Buddhism in the middle of the 20th century. This was in response to the injustices of the caste system practiced within Brahmanism.

== History ==
The Mahars are considered to be the original inhabitants of Maharashtra. The community is also known as Kathiwale (Men with Sticks), Bumiputera (Sons of the Soil), and Mirasi (Landlords). Traditionally they have the role of defending village boundaries from outsiders, invading tribes, criminals, and thieves. The Kathiwale name represents their former duty as village administrators. They were also responsible for maintaining law and order throughout the villages as administrators. The Mahars have a long and proud tradition of bearing arms.

From the time of early Islamic rule, villages in Maharashtra were part of the Baluta system. In that system, different castes were assigned different roles, each with its own tasks and rights. The duties assigned to the Mahar in the Baluta system included serving as village watchmen, trackers of thieves, messengers, wall menders, adjudicators of boundary disputes, and suppliers of coarse cloth to the village. In return for these services, the village granted them a watan, or the right to a small piece of land to do their own cultivation. The watan also included a share of village produce. They also worked at times as agricultural labourers. However, the Mahar were socio-economically above most other untouchable groups because their traditional role had been important in the village administrative system. This had necessitated that they had at least a rudimentary education, and frequently brought them into contact with upper-caste Hindus. In the Baluta system, apart from many traditional duties mentioned above, the Mahar were assigned work of removing dead cattle from the village, they also started eating the meat from the cattle that had died naturally. This formed the basis for the caste being treated as untouchables. The Mahar community defends consumption of beef by saying the famines were the reason they started eating the beef.

=== Islamic Era ===
Under Islamic rule, the Mahar served as soldiers in various armies of the Deccan Sultanates, Bahmani Sultanate, and the Mughals. In 14th century, Mahar Bhakti saint Chokhamela, and many of his family members such as Karmamela, Banka, Nirmala, and Soyarabai became popular for their religious poetry called abhang.

=== Maratha era ===
Mahar served in various armies over several centuries. The Maratha king Shivaji Maharaj recruited a number of them into his army in the 17th century due to their loyalty and bravery. They served as guards in hill forts and as soldiers. The Mahar along with the Koli and Marathas defended the fort of Purandar from Dilerkhan's Mughal army in 1665.

=== British India ===
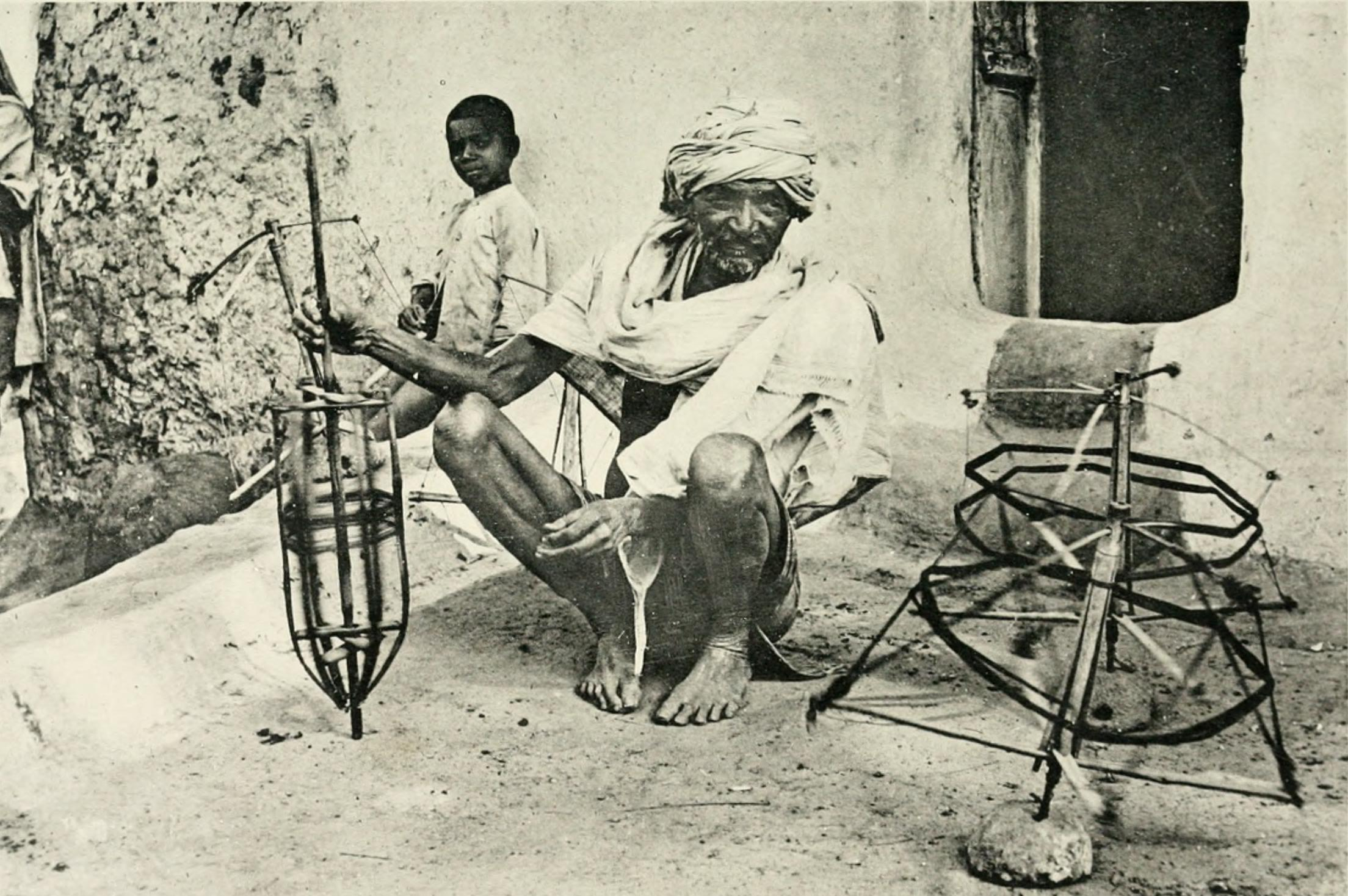
A Mahar Man winding thread from The Tribes and Castes of the Central Provinces of India (1916)

Under British rule, the Mahars became aware of the scope for social and political advancement. Their traditional role had been low-status but important in the village system.

==== Military role under the British ====
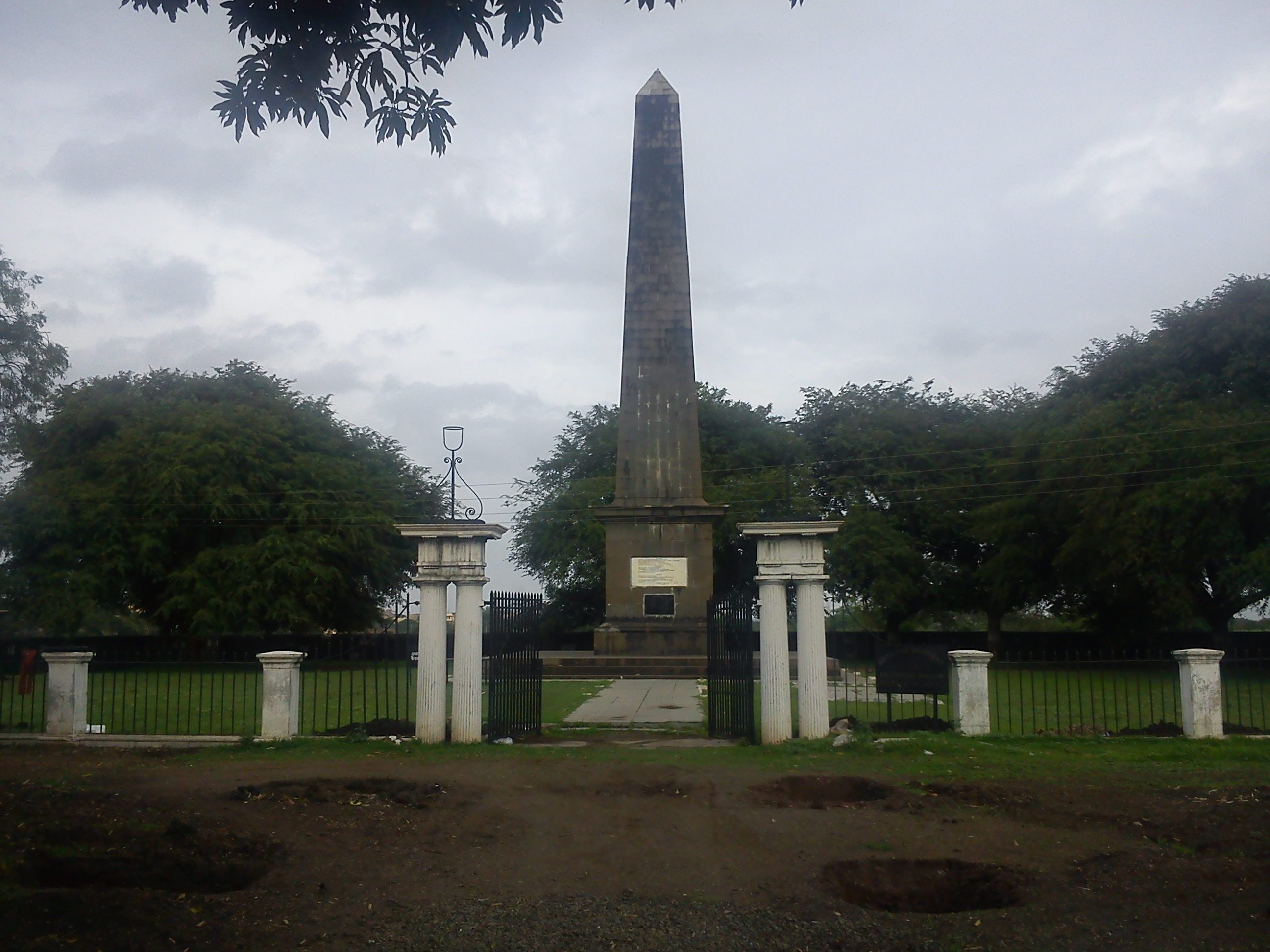
Bhima Koregaon Victory Pillar

During the colonial period, large numbers of Mahars and Dhors were recruited for military duties by the East India Company and the British Raj. The Battle of Koregaon (1 January 1818) is commemorated by an obelisk known as the Koregaon pillar—which was erected at the site of the battle—and by a medal issued in 1851. The pillar featured on the Mahar Regiment crest until the Independence of India; it is inscribed with the names of 22 Mahars killed at the battle. The victory pillar serves as focal point of Mahar heroism.

The Mahar began their service to the East India company around 1750. 20-25% of the British Bombay Army was Mahar. Their conduct as soldiers was praised by many British officers. Mahars were a vital component of the British Marine Battalion. In the East India Company Army they participated in various wars including Second Anglo-Maratha War, Third Anglo-Maratha War, Second Anglo-Sikh War and Second Afghan War.

After the 1857 mutiny, the British decided to change their military recruitment policy. One report "emphasized that we cannot practically ignore it [the caste system], so long as the natives socially maintain it". This led to the discrimination against the Mahars, other low castes, and some Brahmin castes.

Mahar recruitment reached its nadir in the early 1890s when the British halted recruitment of Mahars in favour of "martial races", especially north-western communities. The Mahar community attempted to confront this block with a petition circulated among the Mahar, Chamar, and Mang former soldiers—all Marathi-speaking lower castes—but the movement was unable to organise and submit their petition. The attempt at a challenge had been spearheaded by Gopal Baba Walangkar, himself a Mahar and former soldier, but he found that Mahar military pensioners were unwilling to sign because they feared that they might lose their pensions. Thus, by the beginning of World War I, there were few Mahars left in the Army.

A Mahar regiment was created during World War I because of British desperation for additional troops but only lasted for a few years and. In 1941, the Mahar Regiment proper was created.

==== Jyotirao Phule ====
In 1873, Jyotirao Phule, the founder of Satyashodhak Samaj—which aimed to abolish religious slavery—organised Mahars. At that time, Mahars were not allowed to enter Hindu temples and were considered unclean. Even their entry into the shrines of Hindu gods was restricted. Their first conference was held in Mumbai in 1903.

==== Shahu of Kolhapur ====
Shahu, the ruler of the princely state of Kolhapur, abolished Mahar watan in 1918 and freed the Mahars in his territory from the slavery imposed by the society of the day. He also gave them all the human rights and equality that others enjoy.

==== B. R. Ambedkar ====
In the 20th century, top leader Bhimrao Ramji Ambedkar organized the Mahars and created radical political awakening among them and inspired them to pay attention towards education. Before his death in 1956, Ambedkar, along with millions of his Mahar followers, converted to Buddhism as a protest against the caste discrimination of Hindus.

=== After Independence ===
Despite being the second largest community in Maharashtra after the Maratha, the Mahar community does not command influence in the upper levels of Maharashtra politics.

== Demographics ==
In 1969, the Mahars constituted about 70% of the total Scheduled Caste population and also represented about 9% of population of the state of Maharashtra. Mahar is numerically the largest Scheduled Caste in Maharashtra, according to the 2001 Census of India. As of 2017, the Mahar community was designated as a Scheduled Caste (SC) in 16 Indian states, being: Andhra Pradesh, Arunachal Pradesh Assam, Chhattisgarh, Dadra and Nagar Haveli, Daman and Diu, Goa, Gujarat, Karnataka, Madhya Pradesh, Maharashtra, Rajasthan, Telangana, West Bengal and Haryana.

According to the 2011 census, the Mahar population in Maharashtra is 80,06,060, which is 60.31% among Scheduled Castes, and 7.12% in the state.

== Culture and social stratification ==
Historically Mahar had "12 and half" endogamous subcastes. The major subcastes include Ladvanshi (derived from "Lata Pradesh" current Gujarat), Somvanshi, Andhavanshi, Tilvanshi, Bawane (Bhavani Mahar), Gondvanshi, Kadvanshi and Kosare. These subcaste names are not totemistic. Some of the subcaste names represent the territory they controlled or occupied, while other subcaste names represent the acts their founders did. The Somavanshi Mahar trace their descent (bloodline) from the Mahabharata's Pandava. The Somavanshi Mahar claim to have taken part in the Mahabharata war and subsequently settled in Maharashtra. Before converting to Buddhism these subcastes would not marry or eat with one another.

The Mahars of the Deccan speak a non-standard version of Marathi. When a Mahar meets a man of his own caste he says Namastu, and when he meets anyone other than a Mahar he says Johar (possibly from the Sanskrit Yoddhar or Warrior). Mahars belonging to different regions are not permitted to intermarry unless some family connection can be traced between them. The Mahars are divided into number of exogamous groups or clans or kuls. There is evidence that each of the exogamous group historically owned and worshipped Devak or Totem, which is important at the time of a marriage ceremony. Members of families with a common Devak cannot intermarry.

Clan System of Mahar
Clan	Totem
Bagad	Umbar (Ficus glomerata)
Bhagat	Cobra
Gaekwad	Crab, sunflower, Kohala (Cucurbita Pivi)
Jadhav	Palm (Borassus Flabellzjerz), Pankanis (Typha Angustata), Tortoise(Kasav)
Kadam	Kadamba (Anthocephalus Cadumba).
Mohite	Umbar (Ficus Glomerata)
More	Peacock
Satpal	Cobra
Shevale	Nagvel (Pieper Betle)
Sonkamble	Champa (Mesua Ferrea).
Suryavanshi	Sunflower
Talvatke	Copper
Tambe	Umbar (Ficus Glomerata).
Zankare	Mango, Umbar, Zambul.

In most cases Devak has become became obsolete and has been replaced by a composite Devak called Panchpalvi composed of the leaves of five trees.
A few examples of Panchpalvi used in different districts and regions of present day Maharashtra state are,

- Khandesh
  - Arkathi
  - Borkathi
  - Jambul
  - Mango
  - Ruchkin
- Poona
  - Mango
  - Pipal
  - Rui
  - Shami
  - Umbar

=== Dalit literature ===
Eleanor Zelliot asserts that Dalit literature originated in Marathi-speaking areas of Maharashtra. She credits Dr. Babasaheb Ambedkar, a Mahar, for inspiring many Dalit writers. Baburao Bagul (1930–2008), Shankarrao Kharat, and Bandhu Madhav were early Marathi writers from the Mahar community. The Mahar writer Namdeo Dhasal (who founded Dalit Panther) was significant in the Dalit movement. Other notable Mahar authors writing in Marathi include Shantabai Kamble, Urmila Pawar, Raja Dhale, Daya Pawar, and Narendra Jadhav.

== Religion ==
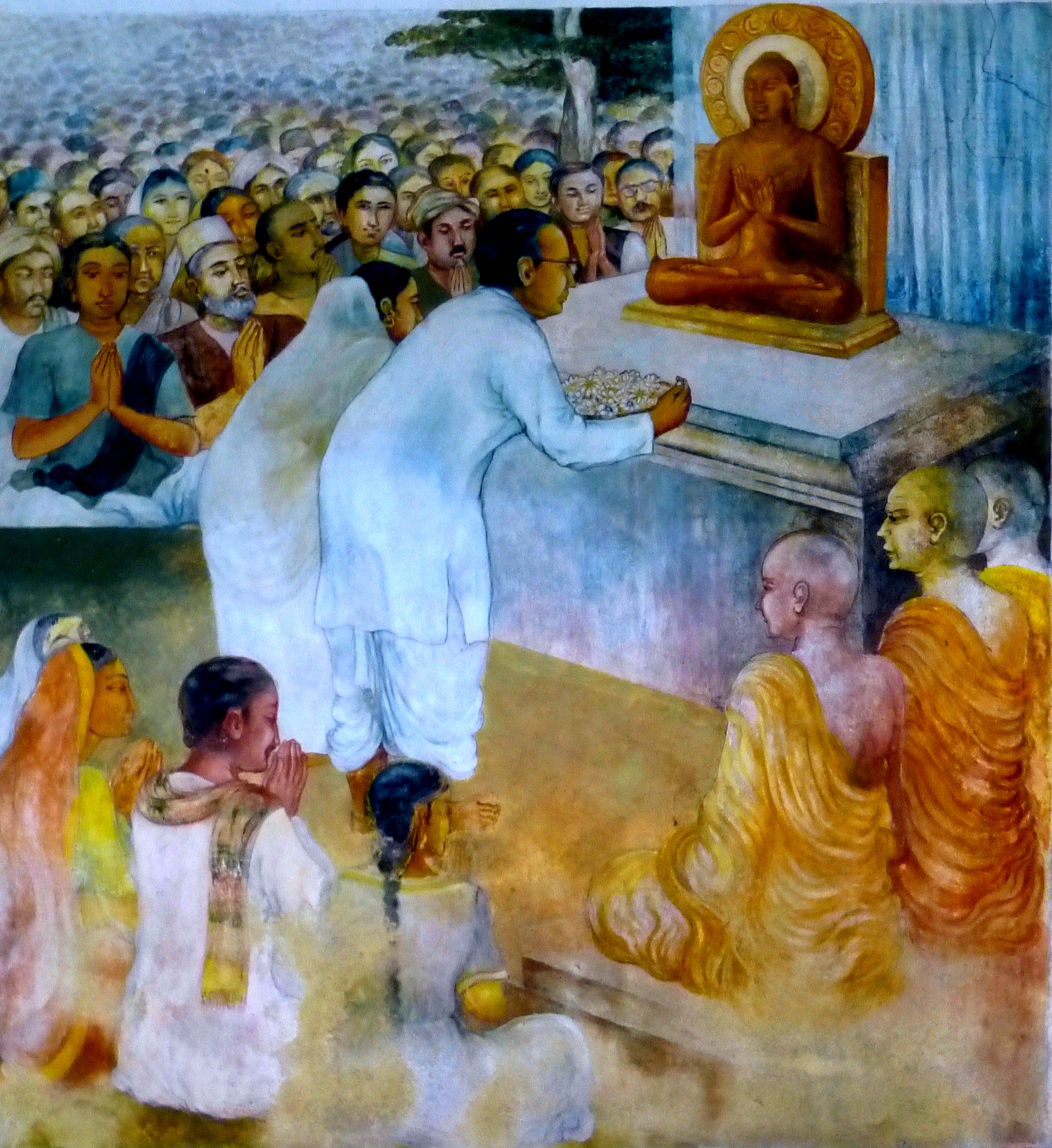
The Dalit Buddhist Movement was begun by B. R. Ambedkar when he converted with his followers in 1956 in Deekshabhoomi, Nagpur.

Religion-wise population of the Mahars, as per 2011 census.

- Buddhist Mahars – 49,43,821 (61.75%)
- Hindu Mahars – 30,54,158 (38.15%)
- Sikh Mahars – 8,081 (0.10%)
- Total Mahars – 80,06,060 (100%)

In the 2011 census, 62% of Mahars stated Buddhism as their religion. Among the Scheduled Caste Hindus (Dalit Hindus) in Maharashtra, the proportion of Mahars is the highest at 38%. And 95% of Scheduled Caste Buddhists (Neo-Buddhists) and 70% of Scheduled Caste Sikhs (Dalit Sikhs) belong to the Mahar caste.

=== Buddhism ===
When B. R. Ambedkar converted to Buddhism at Nagpur in 1956, many Mahars among his followers chose to do the same. As Buddhists, they gave up their traditional Hindu occupations and sought to redefine their social status. Ambedkar died about two months after this mass conversion, and after his cremation more Mahars converted to Buddhism. Now, the Buddhist (Mahar) community is the third most populous in Mumbai.

Buddhism appealed to the sense of equality for the Mahars to the extent that some Buddhist Mahar leaders maintain that the term Mahar should no longer be applied to converts to Buddhism. As one intellectual of Mahar origin said, "I have accepted Buddhist doctrine. I am Buddhist now. I am not Mahar now, not untouchable nor even Hindu. I have become a human being".

In a 1996 book, authors De and Shastree claimed that it has been difficult for the Neo-buddhists to totally abandon the rituals, practices, and festivals of their old Hindu religion. In 1962, V R Ranpise, an early buddhist convert, wrote a book in Marathi called Boudha Samskar Path as a guide to his fellow converts. It appears, however, that very few have read the book.

=== Hinduism ===
Before the Mahar mass conversion to Buddhism, the important deities of Mahar were Shiva, Khandoba, Vithoba and the varkari saints, Chokhamela and Dnyaneshwar. Family deities of Mahars are typically Shiva, Maridevi, Bhumidevi, Navanathas and Bhavani. The Nag (king cobra) was particularly revered by the community.

=== Sikhism ===
Some Mahars in Maharashtra practice Sikhism. According to the 2011 census, there were 11,485 Scheduled Caste (SC) Sikhs in Maharashtra, of which 8,081 were Mahars.

=== Christianity ===
In the late 19th century, Otto Weishaupt's attempts to evangelise in the Sangamner area of Ahmadnagar district met with resistance, but his efforts to promote Christianity did appeal to few Mahars. Legally, Christian Mahars are not considered as Scheduled Castes (SCs).

=== Islam ===
Some Mahars in Maharashtra practice Islam.The Mahar people converted to Islam during the rule of Aurangzeb, a Mughal emperor in India. They have been faithful to Islam ever since. Most live in Maharashtra.The Muslim Mahar are noted for their faithfulness to the tenets of Sunni Islam. Yet they have some of their own spiritual practices that are not found in the Quran. Legally, Muslim Mahars are not considered as Scheduled Castes (SCs).

== Notables ==
- B. R. Ambedkar

== See also ==
- Dalit Kitchens of Marathwada
