= Satpal =

Satpal is an uncommon Indian/Punjabi unisex name. It is also one of a clan in Mahar caste.

== People named Satpal ==
- Satpal Gosain (1935–2020), Indian politician
- Satpal Maharaj, spiritual leader and politician
- Satpal Ram, British man whose conviction for murder caused controversy
- Satpal Singh, Indian wrestler most famous for coaching Indian wrestling bronze medallist Sushil Kumar
