= Sant Nirmala =

Indian poet and Dalit saint

- Born: 14th Century
- Years active: 14th Century
- Spouse: Sant Banka

Sant Nirmala was a 14th-century poet from Maharashtra, India. As the younger sister of Chokhamela, she was deemed equally holy with her brother and thus is also deemed a Hindu saint. Nirmala was married to Banka, of the Mahar caste. Her writings consist largely of abhangs that describe the injustice and inequalities she suffered as a result of the caste system.

Nirmala regretted worldly married life and reveled in the god of Pandharpur. She never mentions her husband, Banka, in her poems.
