= Mangalwedha jowar =

Variety of sorghum from Maharashtra, India

Mangalwedha jowar (मंगळवेढ्याची ज्वारी)
- Geographical indication
- Alternative names: Maldandi jowar
- Description: Mangalwedha jowar is a sorghum variety cultivated in Maharashtra
- Type: Jowar
- Area: Mangalwedha, Solapur district
- Country: India
- Registered: 31 March 2016
- Official website: ipindia.gov.in

Mangalwedha jowar is a variety of sorghum cultivated in the Indian state of Maharashtra. Maldandi jowar is traditional variety of grain and widely cultivated crop in the Mangalwedha taluka of Solapur district. ICRISAT developed several new varieties by incorporating genes from the Mangalwedha Maldandi (M-35-1) strain.

Under its Geographical Indication tag, it is referred to as "Mangalwedha jowar".

== Name ==
Mangalwedha jowar is a prized crop in Mangalwedha taluka and so named after it. It is locally known as "Maldandi jowar".

== Description ==
Mangalwedha Jowar is a variety of sorghum known for its sweet taste and nutritional value. It has bold, lustrous grains with thin pericarp and offers high grain and fodder yield and quality. This variety contains a high percentage of glucose compared to other types of Jowar.

Mangalwedha Jowar has been cultivated for several hundred years for grain and fodder use. It is grown under receding soil moisture after the rains and has low temperature tolerance. It also has inherent traits that save it from insects and diseases.

In 1930, Mangalwedha Jowar was selected at the Mohol Research Centre to develop hybrid varieties of Jowar. Several varieties were developed at ICRISAT incorporating genes from Mangalwedha Maldandi.

Mangalwedha Jowar dominates the post-monsoon season sorghum areas in India. The roti made from Mangalwedha Jowar is considered to be of high quality in terms of taste and softness due to its rich gluten content. Farmers also report that the milk of cows and buffaloes contains high fat content after consuming Maldandi Fodder, resulting in higher market prices. Additionally, farmers do not use pesticides or fungicides for Mangalwedha Jowar as it is resistant to diseases and pests.

== Geographical indication ==
It was awarded the Geographical Indication (GI) status tag from the Geographical Indications Registry, under the Union Government of India, on 31 March 2016 and is valid until 28 April 2030.

Maldandi Jowar Vikas Sangh from Mangalwedha, proposed the GI registration of Mangalwedha jowar. After filing the application in March 2014, the jowar was granted the GI tag in 2016 by the Geographical Indication Registry in Chennai, making the name "Mangalwedha jowar" exclusive to the jowar crop grown in the region. It thus became the first jowar variety from Maharashtra and the 12th type of goods from Maharashtra to earn the GI tag.

The GI tag protects the jowar from illegal selling and marketing, and gives it legal protection and a unique identity.

== See also ==
- Dagdi Jowar of Jalna
