= Maroli (Solapur district) =

Village in Maharashtra

Maroli मारोळी
- village
- Location in Maharashtra, India Maroli (India)
- Country: India
- State: Maharashtra
- District: Solapur district

Languages
  - Official: Marathi
- Time zone: UTC+5:30 (IST)
- PIN: 413322

Maroli is a village in the Mangalvedha taluka of Solapur district in Maharashtra state, India.

Maroli was one of 10 villages of the Mangalvedha taluka where all voters boycotted the 2009 Indian general election polls. They did so to protest the lack of action by elected officials in resolving problems with water supply.

== Demographics ==
Covering 1,349 hectares (3,330 acres) and comprising 335 households at the time of the 2011 census of India, Maroli had a population of 1700. There were 871 males and 829 females, with 216 people being aged six or younger.
