= Sant Banka =

Sant Banka (also known as Wanka was a poet in 14th century Maharashtra, India. He was husband to Nirmala and brother-in-law to Chokhamela. Born in Mehenpuri, Banka was a member of the Mahar caste.) In most of his abhangs he praised Vitthal in happiness and peace. Infrequently, he described his lower caste birth.

As a bhakti poet saint from the Mahar caste, Banka raised a voice against untouchability which is very relevant to current Dalit literature.
