= Wasud Akola =

Village in Maharashtra

Akola (Wasud)
- Village
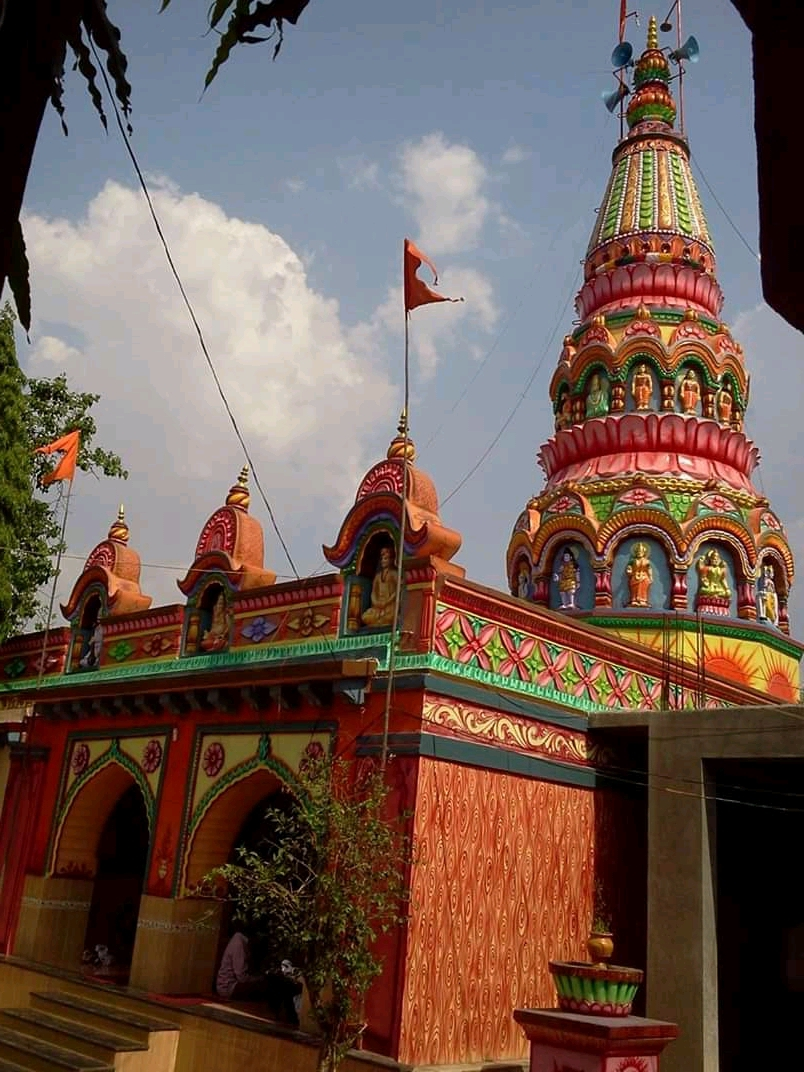
- Siddhanath Temple, Akola
- Interactive map of Akola (Wasud)
- Country: India
- State: Maharashtra

Government

Population (2011)
  - Total: 5,421
- Pincode: 413307

Akola (Wasud) is a small village in Sangole taluka, Solapur district, (Maharashtra), India.
