= Chokhamela =

14th century Hindu saint

Sant Chokhamela
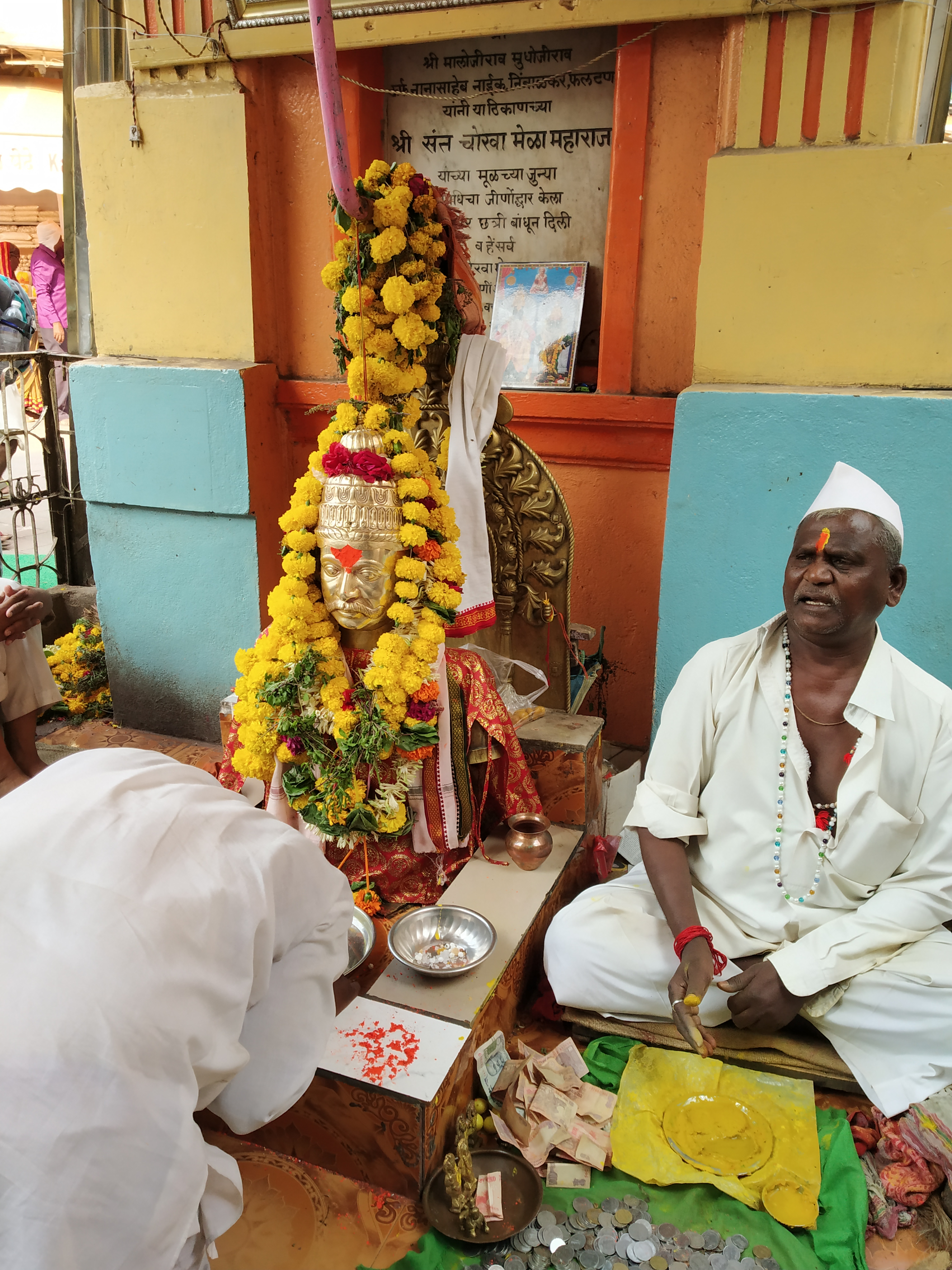
- Statue of Sant Chokhamela at his Samadhi in Pandharpur

Personal life
- Born: Mehuna Raja, Deulgaon Raja Taluka, Buldhana district.
- Honors: Sant (संत) in Marathi, meaning "Saint"

Religious life
- Religion: Hinduism

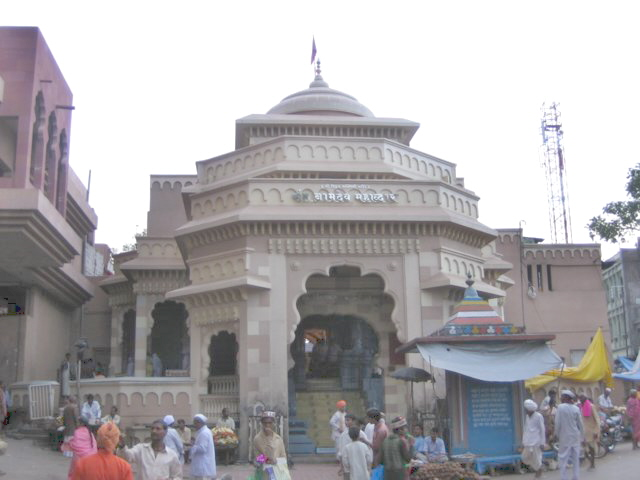
The chief gate of Vithoba Temple. The small blue temple in front of the gate is saint Chokhamela's memorial (samadhi).

Chokhamela was a saint from Maharashtra, India in the 13th–14th century. He belonged to the Mahar caste, which was considered that time one of the low castes in India. He was born at Mehuna Raja, a village in Deulgaon Raja Taluka of Buldhana district. He lived at Mangalwedha in Maharashtra. He wrote many Abhang. One of his known Abhangas is 'Abir Gulal Udhlit Rang". Social activist Arvind Prabhakar Kayande Started Celebrating "Chokhamela Festival" in Deulgaon Raja. He was one of the first low-caste poets in India.

== Life and Family ==
Chokhamela lived with his wife Soyarabai and son Karmamela in Mangalvedha. Chokhamela's task was to guard and work in farms of upper-caste people. His family also followed varkari sect.

- Soyarabai - Wife
- Sant Nirmala - Sister and her husband Sant Banka (who is brother of Soyarabai)
- Karmamela - Son

Chokhamela was initiated into bhakti (spirituality) by the poet-saint Namdev (1270-1350 CE). Once when he visited Pandharpur, he listened to Sant Namdev's kirtan. Already a devotee of Vitthal (Vithoba), Chokha was moved by Namdev's teachings.

Later, he moved to Pandharpur. The traditional story is that the upper castes here did not allow him to enter the temple, nor did they allow him to stand in the door of the temple, so he instead built a hut on the other side of the river Bhima River.

While working on construction of a wall in Mangalvedha, near Pandharpur, the wall fell down, crushing some workers. Chokha was one of them. His tomb is in front of the Vitthal temple, Pandharpur, where it can be seen to this day. According to a legend the bones of the dead Chokhamela were still chanting Vitthal, Vitthal, yearning to visit the Vitthal temple. The bones were buried at the footsteps of the Vitthal temple.

== Books ==
- On the Threshold: Songs of Chokhamela, translated from the Marathi by Rohini Mokashi-Punekar.
- B. R. Ambedkar dedicated his book The Untouchables: Who are They and Why They Became Untouchables to the memory of Chokhamela, Nandanar and Ravidas.
- One Hundred Poems of Chokha Mela, translated from Marathi by Chandrakant Kaluram Mhatre. ISBN 978-93-5212-597-5
- The Courtesan, the Mahatma and the Italian Brahmin: Tales from Indian History by Manu S. Pillai
