= Mangalwedha =

- Town
- Location in Maharashtra, India
- Coordinates: 17.51667°N 75.46667°E
- Country: India
- State: Maharashtra
- District: Solapur

Government
  - Type: Municipal Council

Population (2011)
  - Total: 21,824

Language
  - Official: Marathi

Language
- Time zone: UTC+5:30 (IST)
- PIN: 413305
- Vehicle registration: MH-13

Mangalwedha is a town in the Solapur district in the Indian state of Maharashtra. It is the birthplace of Shri Jayatirtha, also called Teekacharya, one of the prominent saints of the Dvaita school of Vedanta.

== Geography ==
The city of Mangalwedha is situated 55 km west of the district headquarters at Solapur and 25 km southeast of Pandharpur city.

Mangalwedha shares boundaries with Pandharpur, Sangola, Mohol, Jath, and Bijapur in Karnataka.

== History ==
Mangalwedha is also known as the "Land of Saints" as Saint Jayatirtha, Saint Damaji, Saint Kanhopatra, Saint Chokhamela, saint Gopabai are said to have come from Mangalwedha during the 14th century.

Mangalwedha is also known as Jwariche Kothar.

The major crops that are grown in and around Mangalwedha include Jowar, Bajra, groundnut, Sugarcane, and sweetcorn. Mangalwedha's Jowar and Bajra have received geographical indications (GI) tags.

In the 14th century, Mangalwedha was ruled by the Bidar Sultanate followed by the Bijapur Sultanate.

Huljanti village is known for the Mahalingaraya deity and Biroba deity and as well as having a large fair during Diwali. Many people from Maharashtra and Karnataka come there to worship their deities.

Khomnal village is known for the Kamsidhha deity and Maykka deity and as well as having a large fair during Gudi Padwa. kamsiddha deity temple is managed by Sudhir Pandurang Ingale-Patil.

== Cuisine ==
Mangalwedha is known for its cuisine of jowar bhakri and thecha made from coarsely ground green chilis, onion, and chutney of groundnuts. Bhaji (a fritter made from gram flour) and Laddu is another delicacy from Mangalwedha. It is also known for its spicy bhel, pav ragda, vada pav, Basundi, and puri bhaji.

Few weeks before harvesting season of jowar there are privet Hurda Parties all over the Farms . Hurada is roasted and mixed with some spices. It is eaten with different kind of berries.

== Geographical indication ==
Mangalwedha Jowar was awarded the Geographical Indication (GI) status tag from the Geographical Indications Registry, under the Union Government of India, on 31 March 2016 and is valid until 28 April 2030.

Maldandi Jowar Vikas Sangh from Mangalwedha, proposed the GI registration of Mangalwedha jowar. After filing the application in March 2014, the jowar was granted the GI tag in 2016 by the Geographical Indication Registry in Chennai, making the name "Mangalwedha jowar" exclusive to the jowar crop grown in the region. It thus became the first jowar variety from Maharashtra and the 12th type of goods from Maharashtra to earn the GI tag.

The GI tag protects the jowar from illegal selling and marketing, and gives it legal protection and a unique identity.

== Demographics ==
As of the 2011 Census of India, Mangalwedha has a population of 21,824 consisting of 11,109 males and 10,715 females. There were 2,510 children ages 0–6.

Marathi is the official and most spoken language of Mangalwedha. The town also has Urdu and Kannada speaking demographics . Kannada is mostly spoken in villages near the karnataka border.

== Villages ==
- Ganeshwadi
- Kagasht
- Maroli
- Shelewadi
