= Myasthenia (disambiguation) =

Myasthenia is a medical term for muscle weakness. The term may also refer to:

== Medical conditions ==
- Myasthenia gravis
- Ocular myasthenia
- Transient neonatal myasthenia gravis
- Lambert–Eaton myasthenic syndrome
