= Sant Soyarabai =

14th century female Hindu saint

Soyarabai was a saint from the Mahar caste in 14th-century Maharashtra, India. She was a disciple of her husband, Chokhamela.

Soyarabai framed large literature using blank verse of her own devising. She wrote much but only about 62 works are known. In her Abhang she refers to herself as Chokhamela's Mahari, accuses god for forgetting Dalits and of making life bad. Her most basic verses concern the simple food she gives the god. Her poems describe her devotion towards god and voice her objections to untouchability.

Soyarabai believed that "The body only can be impure or polluted, but the soul is ever clean, pure knowledge. The body is born unclean and so how can anybody claim to be pure in body? The body has much pollution. But the pollution of the body remains in the body. The soul is untouched by it."

Soyarabai undertook an annual pilgrimage to Pandharpur with her husband. They were harassed by orthodox Brahmins but never lost their faith and peace of mind.
