= Namdeo Dhasal =

Indian writer

Namdeo Laxman Dhasal
- Born: 15 February 1949; Poona, Bombay Presidency, India
- Died: 15 January 2014 (aged 64); Mumbai, India
- Occupations: Writer, Poet
- Spouse: Malika Amar Sheikh
- Writing career
- Language: Marathi
- Genre: Marathi literature
- Notable works: Andhale Shatak; Golpitha; Moorkh Mhataryane; Tujhi Iyatta Kanchi? Priya Darshini
- Notable awards: Padma Shri; Soviet Land Nehru Award; Maharashtra State Award; Sahitya Akademi Golden Jubilee Award
- Movement: Dalit Panther

Namdeo Laxman Dhasal (15 February 1949 – 15 January 2014) was a Marathi poet, writer and Dalit activist from Maharashtra, India. He was one of the founders of the Dalit Panthers in 1972, a social movement aimed at destroying caste hierarchy in Indian society. The movement was active in the 1970s and the 1980s during which time it popularised the usage of the term dalit in India. Dhasal was awarded the Padma Shri in 1999 and a Lifetime Achievement Award from the Sahitya Akademi in 2004.

== Biography ==
Namdeo Dhasal was born in 1949, in the village of Pur in Khed taluka, Pune, India. He and his family moved to Mumbai when he was six. A member of the Mahar caste, he grew up in dire poverty. He was a Buddhist.

Following the example of the American Black Panther movement, he founded the Dalit Panther movement with friends in 1972. This social movement worked for the reconstruction of society on the basis of the Phule, Shahu, and Ambedkar movements.

Dhasal wrote columns for the Marathi daily Saamana. Earlier, he worked as an editor for the weekly Satyata. In 1972, he published his first volume of poetry, Golpitha. More poetry collections followed: Moorkh Mhataryane (By a Foolish Old Man), inspired by Maoist thoughts; Tujhi Iyatta Kanchi? (How Educated Are You?); Khel; and Priya Darshini, about former Indian Prime Minister Indira Gandhi.

During this time, Dhasal also wrote two novels and published pamphlets such as Andhale Shatak (Century of Blindness) and Ambedkari Chalwal (Ambedkarite Movement), a reflection on the socialist and communist concepts of B. R. Ambedkar.

Later, he published two more collections of poetry: Mi Marale Suryachya Rathache Sat Ghode (I Killed the Seven Horses of the Sun), and Tujhe Boat Dharoon Mi Chalalo Ahe (I'm Walking, Holding Your Finger).

In 1977 Dhasal married noted Marathi writer Malika Amar Sheikh after a brief courtship. However, the marriage was troubled due to Dhasal's alleged domestic violence, alcoholism and problems with debt. In 1981, Dhasal was diagnosed with myasthenia. Later, he suffered from colorectal cancer. He was admitted for treatment in a Mumbai hospital in September 2013. He died in 2014 at age 64.

== Activism ==
In 1972 cracks began to appear in the Dalit Panther movement. Ideological disputes began to eclipse the common goal of liberation. Dhasal wanted to engender a mass movement and widen the term Dalit to include all oppressed people, but the majority of his comrades insisted on maintaining the exclusivity of their organization.

Dhasal's illness and alcoholism overshadowed the following years, during which he wrote very little. In the 1990s, he became politically active again.

In 2001, he made a presentation at the first Berlin International Literature Festival.

Dhasal was one of the founding members and part of the 10-member national presidium of the Republican Party of India, which was formed under leadership of Babasaheb Ambedkar in 1952 by merger of all leading Dalit parties.

== Literary style ==
Arundhathi Subramaniam describes his poetry: "Dhasal is a quintessentially Mumbai poet. Raw, raging, associative, almost carnal in its tactility, his poetry emerges from the underbelly of the city — its menacing, unplumbed netherworld. This is the world of pimps and smugglers, of crooks and petty politicians, of opium dens, brothels and beleaguered urban tenements."

== Works ==
=== Poetry ===
==== English ====
- A Current of Blood (2019), Narayana Publishers ISBN 978-8189059927

==== Hindi ====
- Aakrosh Kaa Kooras (2015)

==== Marathi ====
- Golpitha (1973)
- Tuhi Iyatta Kanchi (1981)
- Khel (1983)
- Moorkh Mhataryane dongar halvle
- Amchya itihasatil ek aprihary patra : Priya Darshini (1976)
- Ya Sattet Jiv Ramat Nahi (1995)
- Gandu Bagichha (1986)
- Mi Marale Suryachya Rathache Sat Ghode
- Tuze Boat Dharoon Mi Chalalo Ahe

Dilip Chitre translated a selection of Dhasal's poems into English under the title Namdeo Dhasal: Poet of the Underworld, Poems 1972–2006.

=== Prose ===
- Ambedkari Chalwal (1981)
- Andhale Shatak (1997)
- Hadki Hadavala
- Ujedachi Kali Dunia
- Sarva Kahi Samashtisathi
- Buddha Dharma: Kahi Shesh Prashna

== Awards and honors ==
The following table shows list of awards won by Namdeo Dhasal.

Year	Award	For
1973	Maharashtra State Award for literature	Literature
1974	Maharashtra State Award for literature	Literature
1982	Maharashtra State Award for literature	Literature
1983	Maharashtra State Award for literature	Literature
1974	Soviet Land Nehru Award	Golpitha
1999	Padma Shri	Literature
2004	Sahitya Akademi's Golden Life Time Achievement	

== Personal life ==
Dhasal was married to Malika Amar Sheikh, the daughter of poet Amar Sheikh. They had one son, Ashutosh.

== Death ==
Dhasal died of colorectal cancer at Bombay Hospital on 15 January 2014.
