= Madgule =

Village in Maharashtra

Madgule (Village ID 568594) is a village near Atpadi town in India.

Prominent Marathi poet Late G.d.Madgulkar and his younger brother, Marathi author Late Venkatesh Madgulkar, belongs to this village. Being original surname as Kulkarni, Madgulkar (means from Madgule) surname was adopted by G.D. Madgulkar which is based on name of Madgule. According to the 2011 census it has a population of 1911 living in 394 households.
