= J. V. Pawar =

Indian poet and novelist

J.V. Pawar co-founder of Dalit Panther
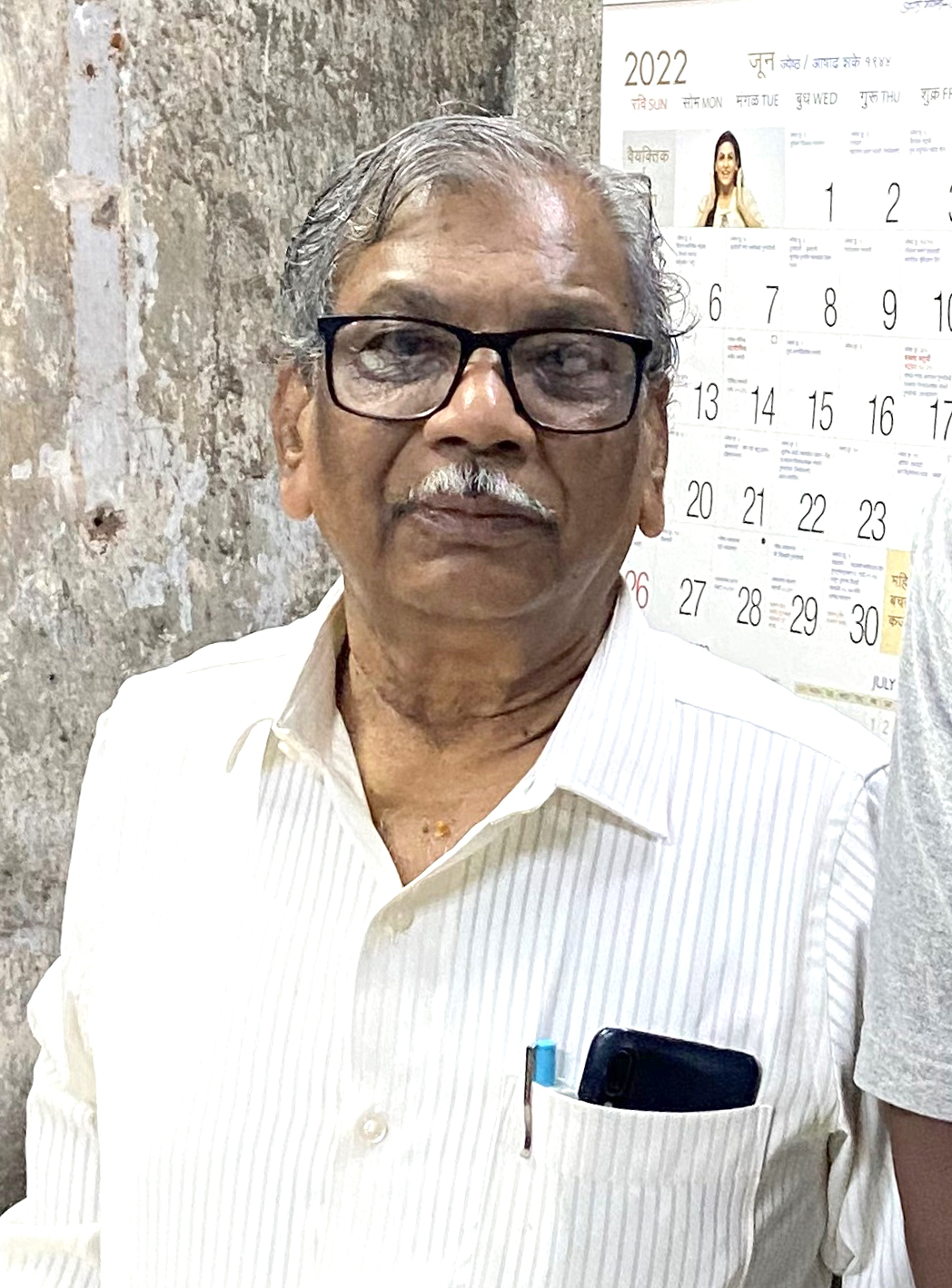
- co-founder of Dalit Panther
- Born: 14 July 1943 (age 83); Chiplun taluka
- Occupations: Poet and novelist

Jayram Vitthal Pawar Aka J.V. Pawar (born 14 July 1943) is a poet and novelist who co-founded the Dalit Panthers organization and served as its general secretary.

== Biography ==
As a novelist and poet Pawar is best known for his 1969 novel 'Balidaan' and 'Naakebandi' his 1976 collection of poems, since translated and published in English as 'Blockade'.

Among his many books, he has devoted himself to documenting and analyzing the post-Ambedkar Dalit movements in several volumes.

A lifelong Ambedkarite, Pawar has been involved in several Dalitbahujan social and political movements in Maharashtra.

== Books ==
- Dalit Panthers
- Mother India: Miss Catherine Mayo's much-loved work
- Dalit Panthers: An Authoritative History
- Ambedkarite Movement After Ambedkar
- Blockade
- Dr. B.R. Ambedkar's Social Revolution
