= Dalit Panthers =

Indian social organization

- Founder: Namdeo Dhasal; J. V. Pawar
- Founded: 9 July 1972 (Note: There are different recordings on the day of the foundation. Mamta Rajawat in Encyclopedia of Dalits in India states it was established in April 1972, while Mid-Day's Prutha Bhosle affirms it was on 29 May 1972, and Sebastian Maria Michael, author of Dalits in Modern India: Vision and Values, states it occurred on 9 July 1972.)
- Dissolved: 1988
- Ideology: Dalit socialism Anti-casteism; Buddhism; Marxism

The Dalit Panthers was a revolutionary organisation in India that sought to combat caste discrimination. Inspired by the Black Panther movement in the United States, Mahar poet-writers J. V. Pawar, Namdeo Dhasal, and Raja Dhale founded the Dalit Panthers in 1972 as a response to the growing discontent among the Dalit youth. They urged a boycott of the 25th Independence Day revelry, terming it a 'Black Independence Day'. The movement's heyday lasted from the 1970s through the 1980s, and it was later joined by many Dalit-Buddhist activists.

== Formation and influence ==
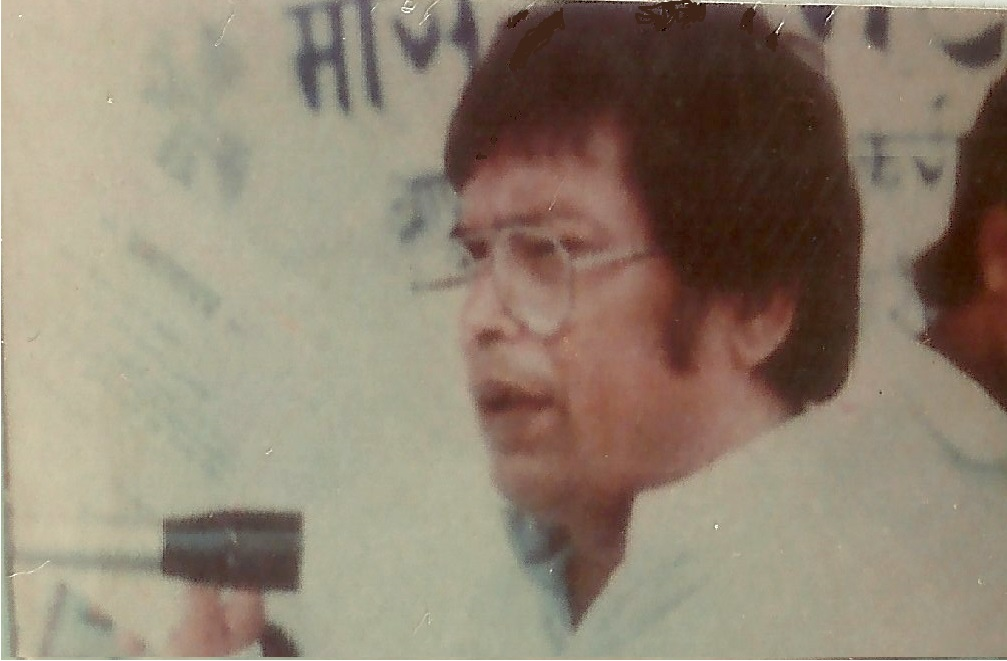
Raja Dhale, one of the first members of the Dalit Panther Party

The backdrop for the formation of the Dalit Panthers was set by various socio-political developments in Maharashtra. The first non-Congress state governments were established in 1967, and global youth political movements gained momentum. The Yuvak Kranti Dal had been formed in Maharashtra, and a mass conversion of Dalits to Buddhism occurred in 1956. The period also witnessed a significant land rights movement led by Dadasaheb Gaikwad and an extension of reservation benefits to converted Buddhists in the late 1960s.

Litterateur J. V. Pawar first became interested in the activism against Dalits discrimination by the time of B. R. Ambedkar's death on 6 December 1956. "Stunned" by Ambedkar's work, he was inspired to write critical pieces in collaboration with poet Namdeo Dhasal. Pawar and Dhasal's attention to the Dalit question was further increased by 1971, when a special committee by the then Prime Minister of India Indira Gandhi reported on atrocities against Dalit and two Dalit women were forced to walk naked in a Maharashtra village. By mid-1972, there was a vacuum created in Dalit politics resulting from Ambedkarite Republican Party of India (RPI) splitting into factions. Motivated by the Little Magazine movement and the blossoming Dalit literature, Pawar and Dhasal started the Dalit Panthers (Note: Several sources state that Raja Dhale was among its founders, but Pawar himself have told that Dhale was invited to him some time after the establishment.) – also as a response to what was perceived as a factionist, corrupt and ageing politics of the RPI. Hoping to break with all established parties, the Dalit Panthers originated with the Scheduled Caste community of the Mahars as its social base.

The Dalit Panthers were largely inspired by the Black Panther Party, a socialist political party that sought to combat racial and economic discrimination against African-Americans, during the civil rights movement in the United States, which occurred in the mid-20th century. Because of this, they adopted Black Panther's organisational structure and strategies, as well as were influenced by African-American literature. During the first public meeting of Dalit Panthers', Pawar invited writer Raja Dhale to give a speech after being impressed by an opinion piece of Dhale ("Black Independence Day") about unfair laws towards Dalits. Dhale's speech was lauded, and Pawar invited him to join the Panthers, which he immediately agreed. After that, Dhale, Dhasal, and Pawar took the role of organisation's president, defence minister and general secretary respectively.

== Worli riots ==
Prior to the foundation of the Dalit Panthers, Shiv Sena, a Hindutva political party, was the most influential organisation among the Maharashtrian youth. Especially in the Worli neighbourhood of Mumbai, Sena influenced both Dalit and non-Dalit youngsters who formed gangs united by their lower-class status that were mobilised by Sena for support in elections. However, the formation of the Panthers led to a declining support for Sena among Dalits and eventually culminated into conflict between the two groups. Sena's partisans said the Dalit Panthers were undermining Maharashtrian unity by raising issues of caste, while the Panthers's counterargument was that the Sena only represented upper-caste individuals. In January 1974, in opposition to both Shiv Sena and RPI leaders who were backing Congress candidate Ramrao Adik, they called for an election boycott of the by-election to the Lok Sabha from the Mumbai South Central Lok Sabha constituency and for the Maharashtra Legislative Assembly. This happened in the context of a "Maharashtra Bandh Day" ("Shut Down Maharashtra"), called 2 January, led by Communist Party of India (CPI) and supported by some opposition parties, including the Panthers. They previously backed a CPI-led mill workers' strike, and, according to Pawar, they wished the win of Roza Vidyadhar Deshpande of the CPI.

In the same year, the organisation was attacked by civilians, mostly Shiv Sena's supporters, and by police at least in two occasions in January. On the fifth day of that month, a Dalit Panther's meeting in Worli was attacked with stones, and police made a lathi charge and arrested 19 persons. Five days later, police arrested four important leaders of the Dalit Panthers during a march against police brutality and partisan attitude against Scheduled Caste persons on a BDD Chawl violence case. During what become known as the Worli riots, Bhagwat Jadhav, a member of the Dalit Panthers, was killed by a grinding stone thrown from an apartment at the rally.

The organisation's heyday lasted until 1977.

== Ideology ==
The Dalit Panthers advocated for and practised radical politics, fusing the ideology of Karl Marx to Indian authors like B. R. Ambedkar and Jyotirao Phule—the latter two being the only authors they recognised being influenced by. Thus, they adopted the idea of class conflict, directing their criticism towards upper-caste capitalists and those who oppressed the Dalits. They openly defended the use of violent strategies, if necessary, and affirmed a complete revolution was needed to fulfill Dalits' emancipation. Accordingly, their manifesto, published in 1973, read as the following: "We do not want a little place in the Brahmin Alley. We want the rule of the whole land, we are not looking at persons but at systems and change of heart ... liberal education will not end our state of exploitation. When we gather a revolutionary mass, rouse the people, out of the struggle, the giant mass will become tidal wave of revolution". According to K. Satyanarayana and Susie Tharu, their manifesto fit the Ambedkarite spirit into a broader Marxist framework and heralded the rise of an autonomous Dalit perspective in post-Independence India. Divergent ideological perspectives emerged within the Dalit Panthers' founding members, particularly between Namdeo Dhasal, Baburao Bagul, and Raja Dhale. The release of the manifesto 'Zahirnama' in 1972 by Dhasal sparked disagreements, with Dhale accusing it of having a purely Communist agenda. However, the Panthers continued to expand their influence in Mumbai, challenging the Shiv Sena and Bal Thackeray. Although they indirectly supported Deshpande of the CPI in 1974, Pawar noted Dhasal was the only Marxist, while he and Dhale were Buddhists, which caused divergences that led to the dissolution of the organisation.

Despite its name and of being generally accepted as a party of the Scheduled Castes of Maharashtra, the organisation did not seek to be an only-Dalit movement; instead, they used of the term "Dalit" to refer to all lower-caste communities and poor among the caste Hindus. In their manifesto, the Dalit Panthers proclaimed themselves defenders of all exploited people in spite of caste or community, namely citing agricultural workers, small peasants, industrial workers, the unemployed and women. It was a characteristic of its distinctive trait: a radicalism that seemed to indicate they were a political force committed to the overthrow of social and political system. (Note: A commentator on Economic and Political Weekly in 1974 analysed that their radicalism was more formal than real as their political influence was limited to Mahars, which made them a "fourth faction of the RPI".) This feature was seen by a commentator on Economic and Political Weekly as derivative of its contact of other Left groups in Mumbai and Pune and their disgust of the RPI. As part of this radicalism, they attacked Hindu deities and popular heroes like Shivaji and campaigned for election boycott. Instead of focusing on the traditional parliamentary arena, they aimed to create an independent mass-based political movement through demonstrations, sit-ins, and strikes.

Comprising working-class individuals, the Panthers garnered support by addressing popular unrest through literature, such as Dagdu Maruti Pawar's 'Kondwada' and J V Pawar's 'Nakebandi.'

=== Martyrdom and Dissolution ===
In 1974, the Worli riots erupted following an event featuring Dhasal and Dhale as speakers. Police repression and attacks by Shiv Sainiks led to the first Dalit Panther martyrs, Bhagwat Jadhav and Ramesh Deorukhkar's death. The movement faced internal challenges during the Emergency when Dhasal expressed support for Indira Gandhi, leading to a crisis within the Panthers.

After the 1976 Nagpur conference, Raja Dhale and J V Pawar departed to form the 'Mass Movement,' marking the second stage of the Panthers.

Post-1976, a new generation of leaders, including Arun Krushnaji Kamble and Ramdas Athawale, took charge, renaming the movement the 'Bharatiya Dalit Panthers.' They played a crucial role in expanding the Panthers' influence to every village, supporting movements like Naamantar for renaming Marathwada University after Ambedkar.

In 1988, Athawale became a minister, and the Panthers were officially dissolved. Subsequent attempts to form a united Republican Party were short-lived.

== Legacy ==
The Dalit Panthers prompted a debate on what should be the ideological focus of the struggle of the down-trodden of Indian society: Buddhism or Marxism and caste or class.

Although their political impact is source of controversy, the Dalit Panthers' impact in the literary and cultural area is more clear. They led a renaissance in Marathi literature and art, and created a new Dalit literature of protest that expanded the frontiers of traditional Marathi works. Their works introduced a multi-caste perspective that seek to depict the fears and hopes of all Indian exploited segments, conceiving the idea of an Indian "proletariat". Opposing what was perceived as "bourgeois" literature, the Panthers used the patois of the Dalit suburban people to represent those who lived in the ghetto. Ultimately, literary critics recognised their innovative and independent style of expressing the hitherto mute masses.

The Black Panther Party acknowledged and supported the Dalit Panthers through the Black Panther newspaper, which circulated worldwide on a weekly basis from 1967 to 1980.

Pawar commented that no organisation fully continued their legacy or replaced the Dalit Panthers' spot as a radical group. He said, "I cannot think of anyone who could replace us, as many end up compromising on their idealism in quest for power in politics. But, the movement for a new radicalism is waiting to be born".

== See also ==
- Bahujan Samaj Party
- Dalit Shoshit Samaj Sangharsh Samiti
- Namantar Andolan
- Anuradha Ghandy
