= Sangole =

City in Solapur (Maharashtra), India

Sangole Sangola
- city
- Location in Maharashtra, India
- Coordinates: 17°26′16″N 075°11′38″E
- Country: India
- State: Maharashtra
- District: Solapur

Government
  - Body: Sangole Municipal Council

Population (2011)
  - Total: 28,116

Languages
  - Official: Marathi
- Time zone: UTC+5:30 (IST)
- PIN: 413307

Sangole (or Sangola) is a city with a municipal council in Solapur district in the Indian state of Maharashtra. It is situated near Holy city Pandharpur . It is located at the intersection of state highways SH-161, SH-3, and SH-71.

Traditionally, in many historic records this area was part of the Mandesh region. Its name is derived from the Maan River. Sangole is known for pomegranate production as well as jowar.

== Demographics ==
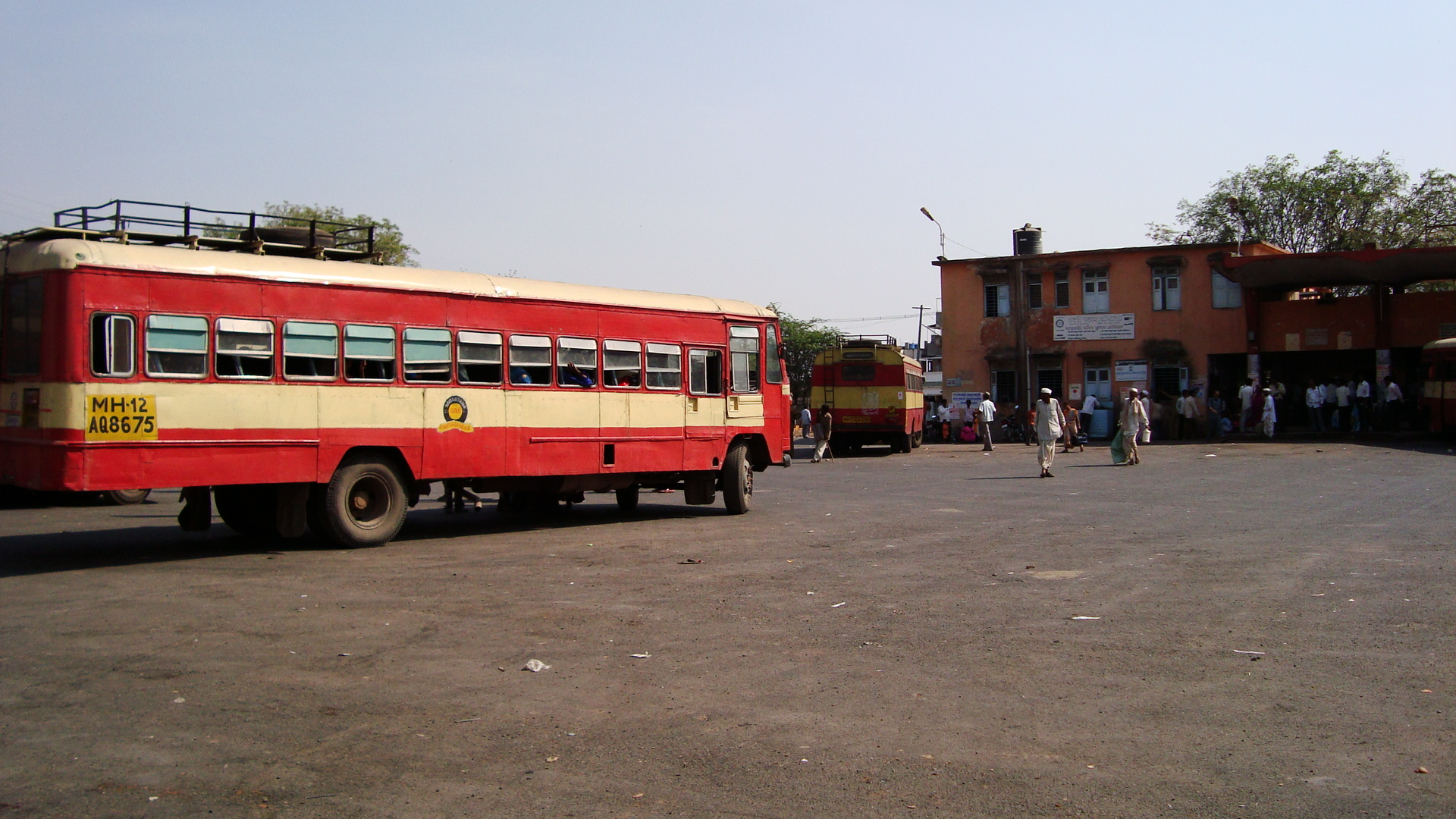
Sangola in the Solapur district

According to the 2011 Indian census, Sangole had a population of 34,321. Males constituted 51% of the population and females 48%. Sangole had an average literacy rate of 82%. Male literacy was 88%, and female literacy was 77%. Twelve percent of the population was under 6 years of age.

== History ==
Sangole was a prominent part of the Maratha dynasty under the Ingoles. It is believed that Sangole as a town was established around the 14th or 15th century by six Ingoles. Babaji Lakhmoji Ingole & his five sons (6 Ingole's) have constructed a fort and situated town Sangole. The name of Sangole is derived from these six Ingoles (Saha Ingole) – Sangole. There is a historic fort inside Sangola town and later the Ingole's were awarded Deshmukhi of Paragane Sangole by Aadilshah of Bijapur. Still in many villages the Deshmukh families are residing – mainly – Sangole city, Deshmukh Vasti- Bamani, Jawala, Sonand. Ingole-Deshmukhs are now farmers holding lands in these villages. The direct descendant of Babaji Raje Ingole resides in Pune, Dnyaneshwar Raje Ingole-Deshmukh. The fort at Sangole was built, reportedly by Deshmukhs under Bijapur's Aadilshah king. It is believed that later the Deshmukh's left the Aadilshah of Bijapur and joined the forces of Chatrapati Shivaji Maharaj. Aadilshah had awarded Deshmukhi of 72 villages of Paragane Sangole to Ingole Deshmukh's. The town later grew up around the fort was so prosperous that it was locally called the Golden Sangola or "Sonyache Sangola" (सोन्याचे सांगोले).

Soon after settlement, due to the large availability of high-quality land, which produced many crops during kharip season, farming and dairy businesses flourished around the area, although at first, Sangole experienced low population density. This proved fortunate, as it was less severely impacted by such historical events as the Durga Devi drought in the 14th century and the failure of the Yadav kingdom at the hands of Alauddin Khalji in nearby Deogiri. In the 15th century, Sambhaji visited the area and Dhangar began to arrive in the city. Significant growth of the Dhangar population occurred between 1690 and 1702.

=== Maratha Empire ===
After the death of Afzal Khan, Shivaji captured the entire region from Wai to Kolhapur. Netaji Palkar is believed to have raided Sangole on 14 November 1659.

== Economy ==
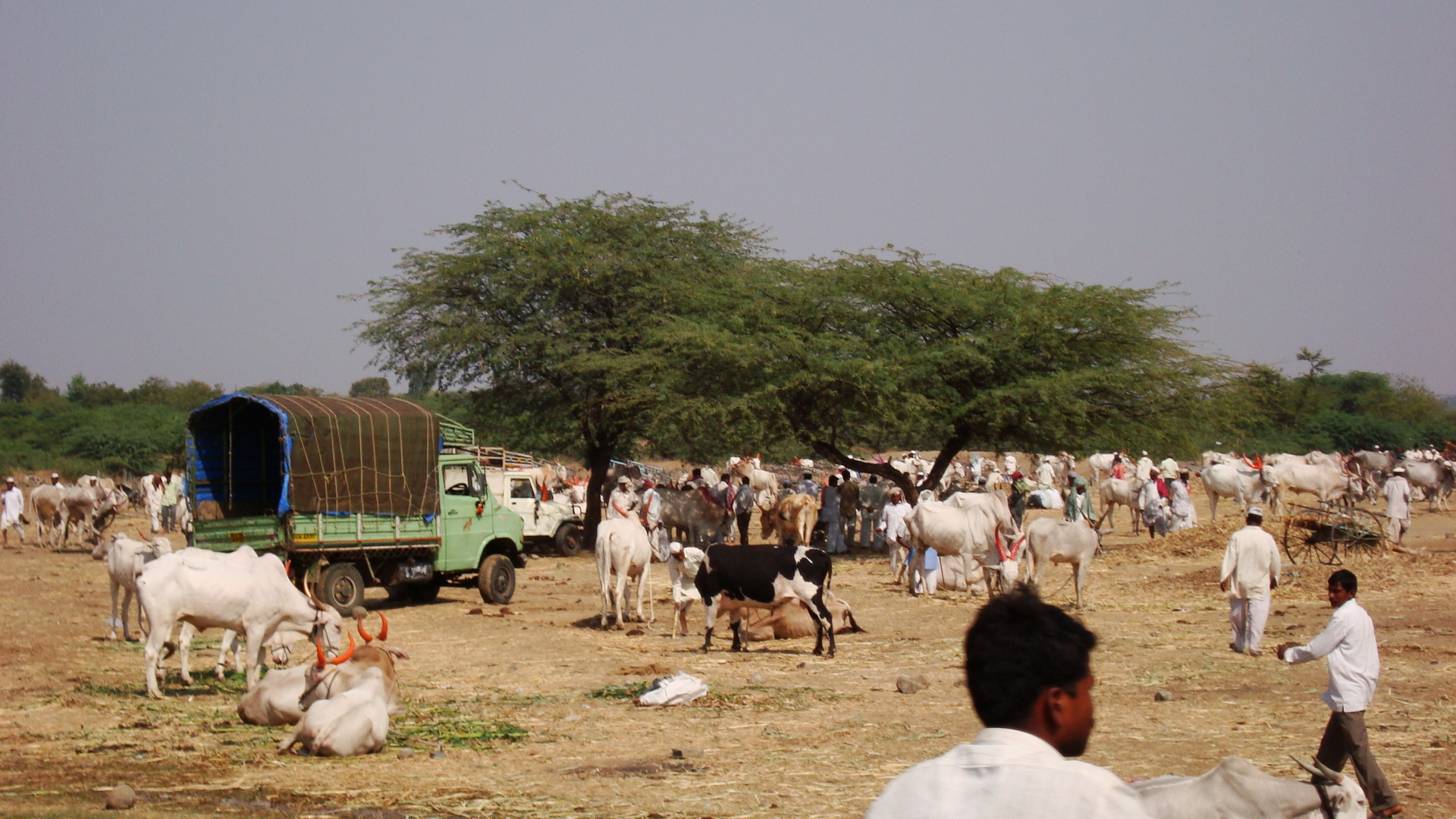
Animals market

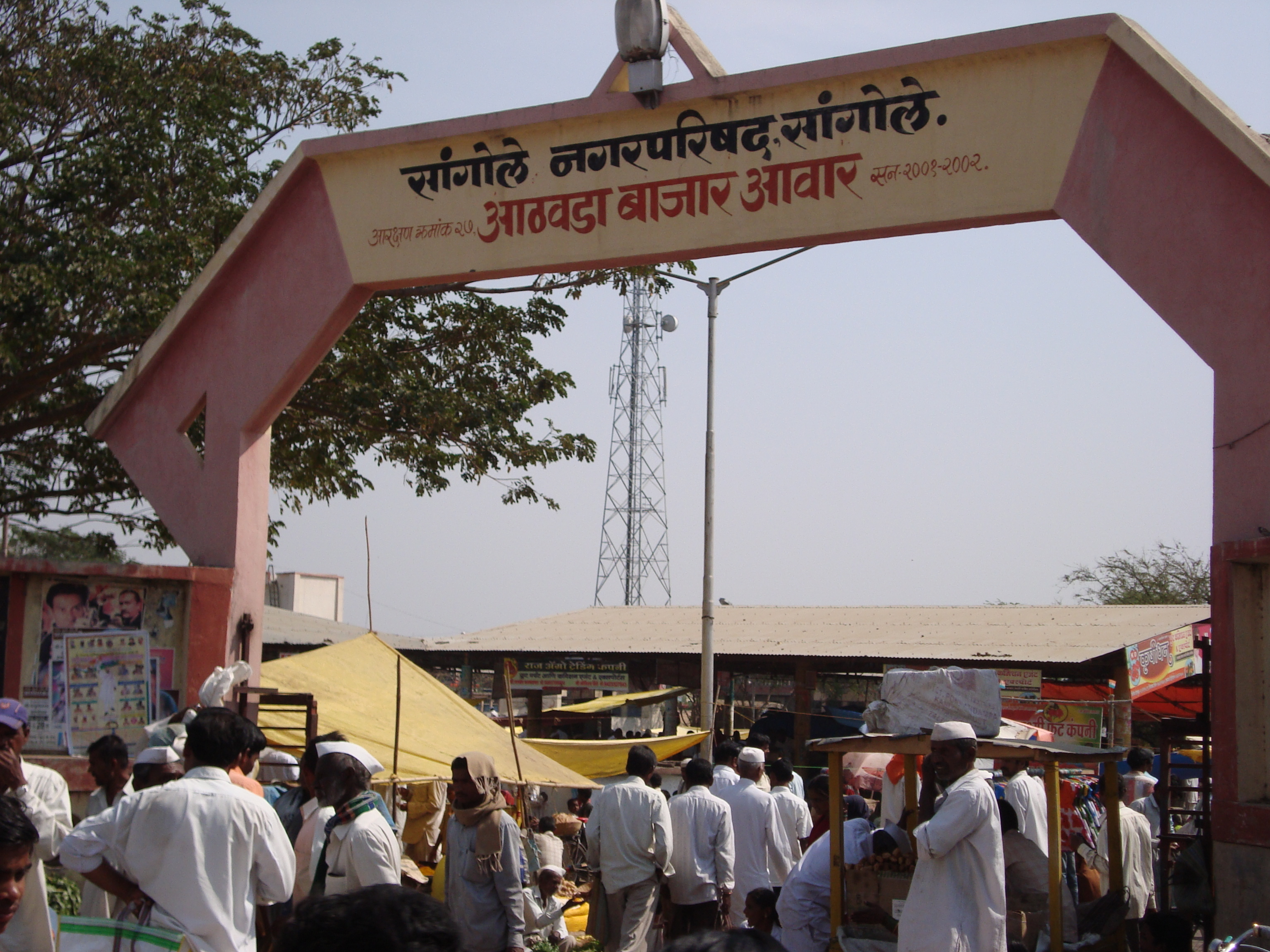
Sangola weekly market

Sangole's economy is primarily driven by agriculture, with textile mills (including cotton), grape processing factories and sugar factories found in the area. One cotton mill, Sangole Taluka Sahakri Sut Girni, was awarded best spinning mill in Asia for a few years.

Sangole is famous for pomegranate production. Sangole pomegranates are exported to the United States, England, and several Middle Eastern countries.

Sangole is known for the Khillari bullocks, specially found in the regional village of Vadhegaon. Maharashtra's animal bazaar is held in Sangole every Sunday.

The Mata Balak Utkarsh Pratisthan , an NGO run by women, is located in Sangole. The NGO is headed by Dr. Kelkar. It is a transformational movement generated for the rural society by the women of the drought-prone region of Sangole and has been operational for the past three decades. Their work areas include women upliftment, schools, aarogya doot, child development, and many more.

The Sangole municipality conducts primary schools and maintains a dispensary with ten beds.

=== Tourist sites ===
Chinke - Ruined shiva temple, loose sculptures of Ganapati.Lakshmi and mithuna figures, all datable to 13 to 14 century AD.

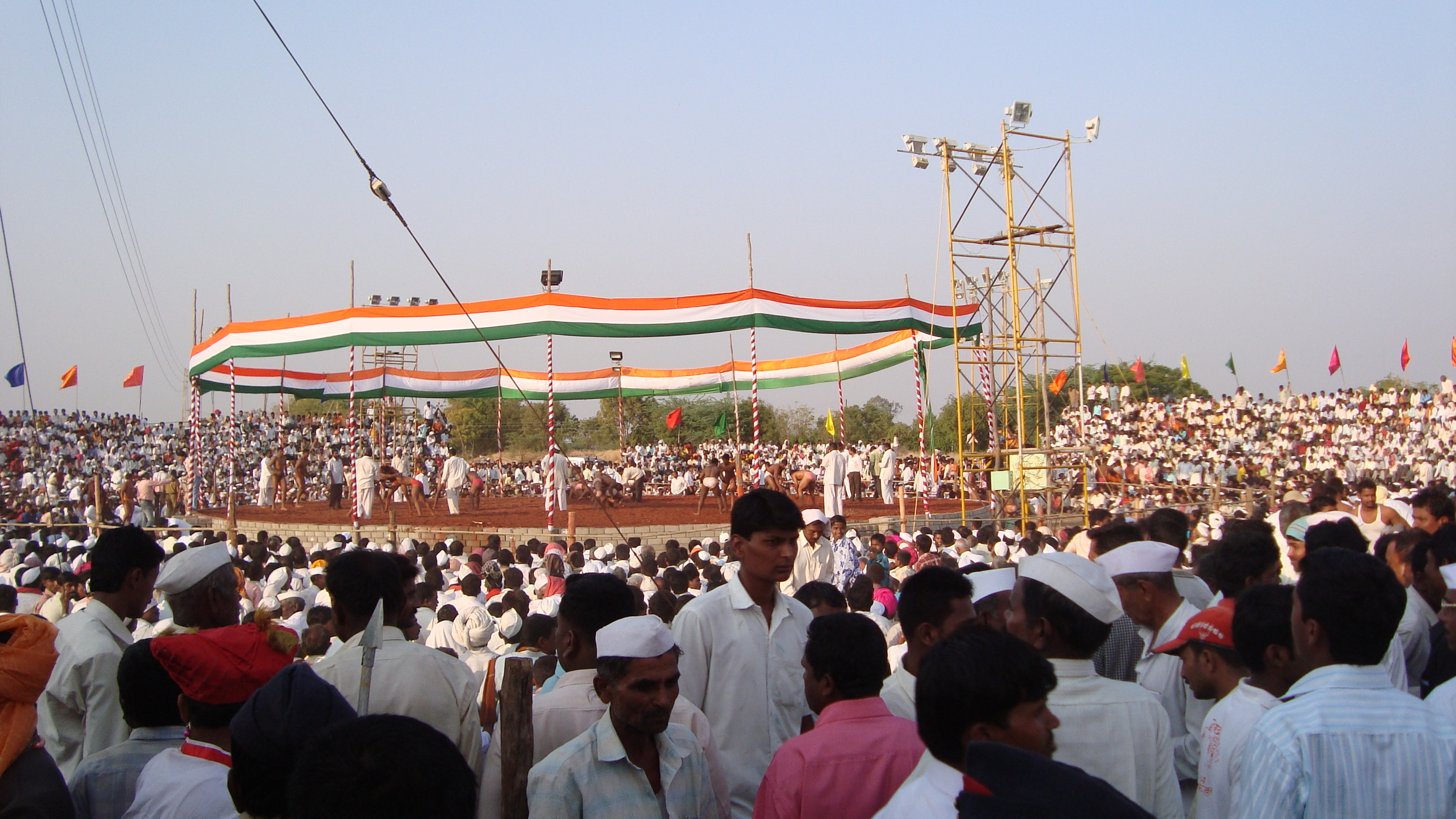
Wrestling competition held at Jawla

Tourist sites in Sangole include the fort and an Ambika Devi temple. (The fort was at the center of action during the time of the rebellion of Yamaji Shivdev against Peshwa Balaji Bajirao in 1750, and also at the time of the attack by Holkar's Pathans in 1802.) Public offices are now housed in the fort. An annual fair is held in the temple during Magha in honor of the goddess, Ambika Devi. Between 5,000 and 10,000 people attend the fair each year.

Nazare, home to the Marathi poet, Sirdhar Swami, is a village in the Sangole district. A sridharswami temple is located on the banks of the Maan river here. A large kolhapur-type wair on the Maan River is on the Nazara-Anakdhal border.

The Dhyan Mandir of Shri Brahma Chaitanya Gondavalekar Maharaj is located approximately 0.5 km from Sangole on the Wadegaon road. Aalegon which is located 16 km towards Gherdi, is also known for Shri. Siddhanth Temple which is having history from Adhilashah emperor, This Temple is known for its popularity in all over the region of the Sangole and nearby locations. Other temples in the area include the Mhasoba Mandir in Sangole, shree siddhanath temple at Alegaon (16 km from sangole) and Satvai Devi Mandir in Pujarwadi. A famous temple of Bhawangiri Maharaj is located in Shirbhavi village, which is 16 km away from sangola. It is built in about 1224. Bhawangiri Maharaj has taken jivant samadhi after sant Dnyaneshwar Maharaj. And their water purification centre which gives drinking water to 81 villages.

=== Nearby ===
Near Sangole there are some historical places, such as Buddihal Bungalow (a bungalow made by the British) and Golghumat. There is also the native place of G M Madgulkar. Gitramayankar Madgule, Tal-Atpadi. Pandharpur, a famous pilgrimage destination, is 30 km from Sangole.

Places of interest nearby Sangole include the following:

• shri mahalaxami devi temple, mahadev temple (kole)

- Mangalwedha Sant Chokhamela samadhi: (30.0 km)
- Pandharpur Lord Vithal-Rukmini Temple: (32.0 km)
- Akluj Sayaji Raje Water Park, Shivshrusti:(60.0 km)
- Mhasoba Temple, Javale
- Sant Shreedhar Swami Matha, who wrote Shivlilamrut.
- Shree Siddhanath Temple, Alegaon.(16 km)
- Sad guru Sayyadbaba Temple, Sonand. (17 km)
- Siddhanath Temple Akola (Wasud)
- Mhasoba Temple, Shinde wasti, Akola (Wasud)

== Transportation ==
Sangole an important road and railway connection on the Pandharpur-Miraj Junction route. It is connected by broad-gauge railway through Miraj, Kurduwadi, and Solapur junctions to other routes throughout the region.

=== Highways ===
Sangole has very good connectivity to other cities via roads. The Ratnagiri to Nagpur highway, also referred to as MSH-3, originates in Ratnagiri and passes through Kolhapur, Sangli, Solapur, Tuljapur, Ausa, Nanded, Hingoli, Yavatmal and Wardha before terminating in Nagpur. Land is being acquired to add extra lanes to this highway. Also, Sangole has two other highways, MSH71 connecting it to Akluj and Jat, and MSH161 connects the city to Pandharpur and Miraj. A new stretch of MSH161 from Sangole to Pandharpur is being built using concrete, will have 4 lanes and is expected to be ready by 31 July 2019.

=== Railroads ===
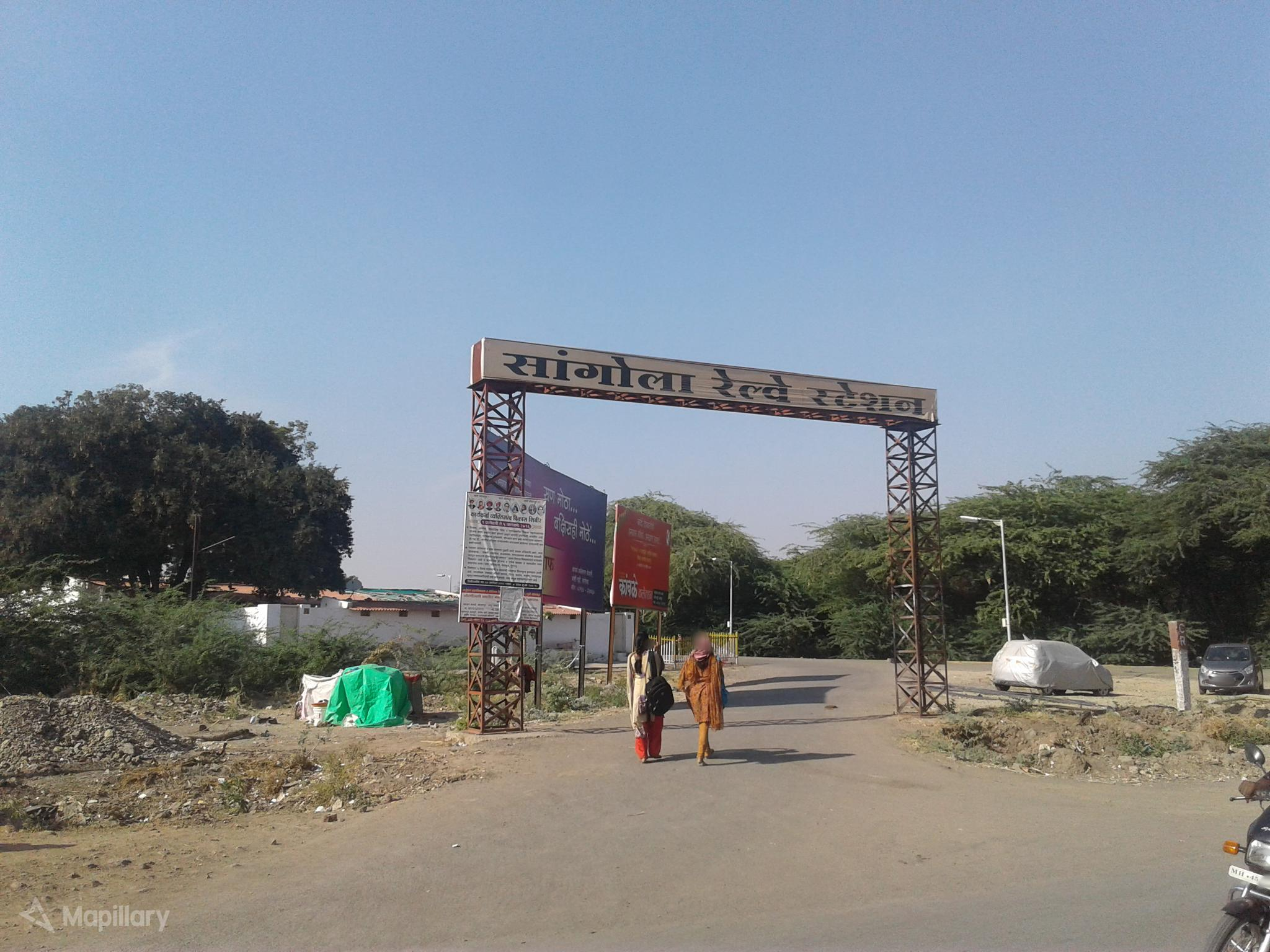
Sangola Railway Station

Sangole lies on the Miraj-Pandharpur railroad. Originally this railroad was narrow-gauge. Between 2009 and 2011, the old narrow gauge was converted to broad-gauge. Sangole railway station has stops by 11051/52 Solapur- SCSMT Kolhapur Express, 51438/39 Miraj-Kurduwadi Passenger, 22155/56 Solapur-Miraj Superfast Express, 16541/42 Yesvantpur – Pandharpur Weekly Express, 11403/04 Nagpur – Kolhapur Express (PT) and 51425/26 Parli Vaijnath – Miraj Passenger.

== Education ==
Colleges and schools found in Sangole include the following:

- New English School & Jr. College Sangola
- Hanuman Vidyalaya,( Wasud Akola)
- L.S.S.Ligade vidyalaya, & Bhai Jagannathrao Ligade Jr. College of science (Agriculture) Akola (wasud)
- Sinhgad College, Kamalapur, Sangola-Miraj Road
- Fabtech College of Engineering and Research, Sangola-Pandharpur Road
- Fabtech public school, Sangola
- STUS Sangola College, Kadlas Road
- Sangola Vidyamandir Prashala, Sangola
- Vidnyan Mahavidyalaya Sangola (VMS), Vasud Road
- Mahatma Phule BEd College, Sangola
- Ashatvinayak Chitrakala Mahavidyalaya (A.T.D.)Sangola.
- LSVD Vidyalaya, Javla
- Kakasaheb Salunkhe Patil Senior College, Javale
- Mandesh Mahavidyalaya, Junoni
- Junoni vidyalaya and Jr. college, Junoni
- Javahar Vidyalaya, Gherdi
- Shivaji Polytechnic, Sangola
- Shridhar Kanya Prashala & Jr College Nazara
- Sangola Vidyamandir English Medium School Sangola
- Shri Ram vidayalaya Hatid, and Junior college Hatid.
- Utkarsha Vidyalaya, Sangola.
- Sangola Mahavidyalaya sangola
- Sahyadri College of Pharmacy, Methwade
