= Dalit history =

History of the Dalit communities

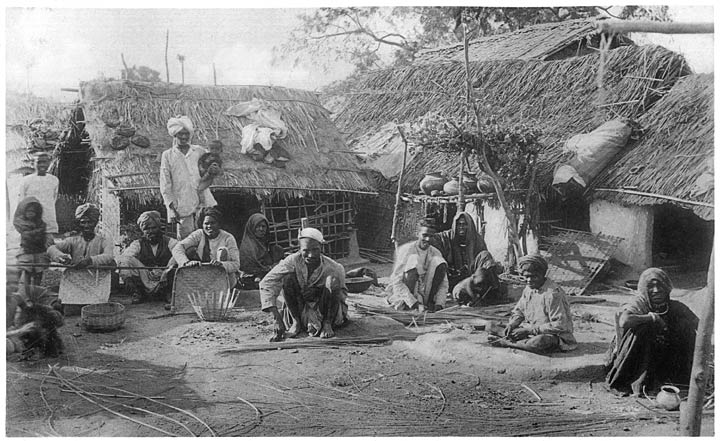
People of Basor Dalit caste, 1916.

Dalit history encompasses the socio-political, economic, and cultural experiences of communities historically regarded as "untouchables" or oppressed castes in the Indian subcontinent. The term Dalit, meaning "broken" or "oppressed" in Sanskrit, was popularized in the 20th century by social reformers like Jyotirao Phule and B. R. Ambedkar to challenge caste-based discrimination and reclaim dignity. Dalit history is marked by systemic exclusion, as well as centuries of resilience, reform, and assertion for equality and human dignity. Dalit history spans centuries, from ancient religious texts and social codes that enforced caste hierarchies, to modern movements for equality, justice, and constitutional rights.

== Ancient and medieval periods ==
2011 Census Scheduled Caste caste distribution map India

The earliest mentions of social stratification appear in the Rigveda, where the Purusha Sukta hymn classifies society into four varnas—Brahmin, Kshatriya, Vaishya, and Shudra. While scholars debate whether this was prescriptive or descriptive, over time these categories hardened into a rigid caste system, eventually excluding large segments of society deemed "untouchables". The roots of caste-based exclusion are found in ancient Hindu scriptures such as the Manusmriti, which codified a hierarchical four-tier varna system and institutionalized untouchability. Those outside the varna system, later called "avarnas", were relegated to occupations deemed impure and were socially ostracized.

The Mahabharata and Ramayana—two key Hindu epics—contain early depictions of caste transgressions. The story of Eklavya, a Nishada prince denied training by Guru Drona due to his caste, and Shambuka, a Shudra punished for performing penance, reflect deeply ingrained notions of caste hierarchy.

Despite systemic exclusion and marginalisation, spiritual resistance was not absent. The Bhakti movement saw the emergence of saint-poets from Dalit and lower-caste backgrounds, including Ravidas, Chokhamela, and Kabir, who became central to the Bhakti movement, preaching spiritual equality and denouncing caste hierarchies. From southern India, saints like Nandanar, a Paraiyar devotee of Shiva from Tamil Nadu and Gora Kumbhar, a potter-saint from Maharashtra, expressed deep devotion while challenging caste exclusion through their lives and hymns.

== Colonial period ==
During the British Raj, caste identities were formalized through censuses beginning in 1871, which reinforced and rigidified caste boundaries within administrative categories. The British colonial state often treated caste as a fixed, hierarchical system, which led to both codification and deepening of caste divisions. At the same time, colonial modernity created spaces for early anti-caste activism. Iyothee Thass, a Tamil intellectual and writer, publicly rejected Hinduism and advocated for a return to Tamil Buddhism. In 1898, he founded the "Dravida Mahajana Sabha" and launched the newspaper Oru Paisa Tamilan, through which he criticized Brahmin domination and caste-based inequality. They also promoted education and rights for Dalits.

In western India, Gopal Baba Walangkar (c. 1840–1900), a former army soldier, is regarded as one of the first Dalit ideologues and the pioneer of the Dalit movement. His 1888 pamphlet, Vital Vidhvansak, openly criticized caste oppression and advocated social reform. Shahu Maharaj, the ruler of Kolhapur State, introduced reservations for non-Brahmins and Dalits in education and employment well before Indian independence. Another pioneer was Harichand Thakur (c. 1812–1878) with his Matua organisation that involved the Namasudra (Chandala) community in the Bengal Presidency. Another early social reformer who worked to improve conditions for Dalits was Jyotirao Phule (1827–1890).

Christian missionaries, particularly in south and northeast India, contributed to the spread of education among Dalits, although conversions also attracted backlash from caste-Hindu elites.

In North India, certain Dalit sub-groups such as the Jatav community also experienced organised social mobilisation during the early twentieth century, with efforts directed toward education, community organisation, and political participation.

== The Ambedkar era ==
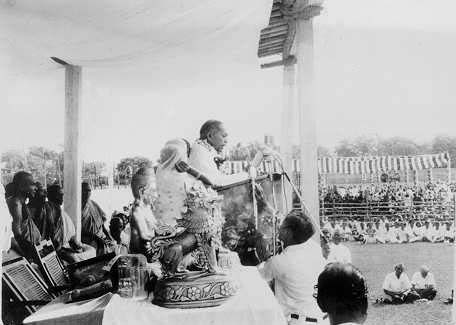
Ambedkar delivering a speech during a mass conversion ceremony, 1956

B. R. Ambedkar (1891–1956), born into the Mahar caste, emerged as the most prominent leader in Dalit history. He earned doctorates from Columbia University and the London School of Economics, and led campaigns for equal access to water, education, and temples—such as the Mahad Satyagraha (1927) and Kalaram Temple Entry (1930).

As chair of the drafting committee of the Constitution of India, Ambedkar ensured legal safeguards for Scheduled Castes. In 1956, he and over 500,000 followers converted to Navayana Buddhism, initiating the Dalit Buddhist movement.

== Post-Independence movements ==
The Constitution of India outlawed untouchability under Article 17 of the Constitution of India, and introduced reservations for Scheduled Castes in education, politics, and employment. Soon after its independence in 1947, India introduced a reservation system to enhance the ability of Dalits to have political representation and to obtain government jobs and education. The 1950 Constitution of India included measures to improve the socio-economic conditions of Dalits. Aside from banning untouchability, these included the reservation system, a means of positive discrimination that created the classification of Scheduled Castes as Dalits. Communities that were categorised as being one of those groups were guaranteed a percentage of the seats in the national and state legislatures, as well as in government jobs and places of education.

By 1995, of all federal government jobs in India – 10.1 per cent of Class I, 12.7 per cent of Class II, 16.2 per cent of Class III, and 27.2 per cent of Class IV jobs were held by Dalits. Of the most senior jobs in government agencies and government-controlled enterprises, only 1 per cent were held by Dalits, not much change in 40 years. In the 21st century, Dalits have been elected to India's highest judicial and political offices. In 1997, India elected its first Dalit President, K. R. Narayanan. Many social organisations have promoted better conditions for Dalits through education, healthcare and employment. Nonetheless, while caste-based discrimination was prohibited and untouchability abolished by the Constitution of India, such practices are still widespread. To prevent harassment, assault, discrimination and similar acts against these groups, the Government of India enacted the Prevention of Atrocities Act, also called the SC/ST Act, on 31 March 1995.

In accordance with the order of the Bombay High Court, the Information and Broadcasting Ministry (I&B Ministry) of the Government of India issued an advisory to all media channels in September 2018, asking them to use "Scheduled Castes" instead of the word "Dalit".

Yet caste-based atrocities—such as the Karamchedu massacre (1985), Tsundur massacre (1991), and Khairlanji massacre (2006)—exposed the gap between law and reality.

In 1972, the Dalit Panthers emerged in Maharashtra, inspired by the Black Panther Party in the United States. Their literature and activism—led by poets like Namdeo Dhasal—voiced Dalit anger, identity, and aspiration.

== Contemporary developments ==
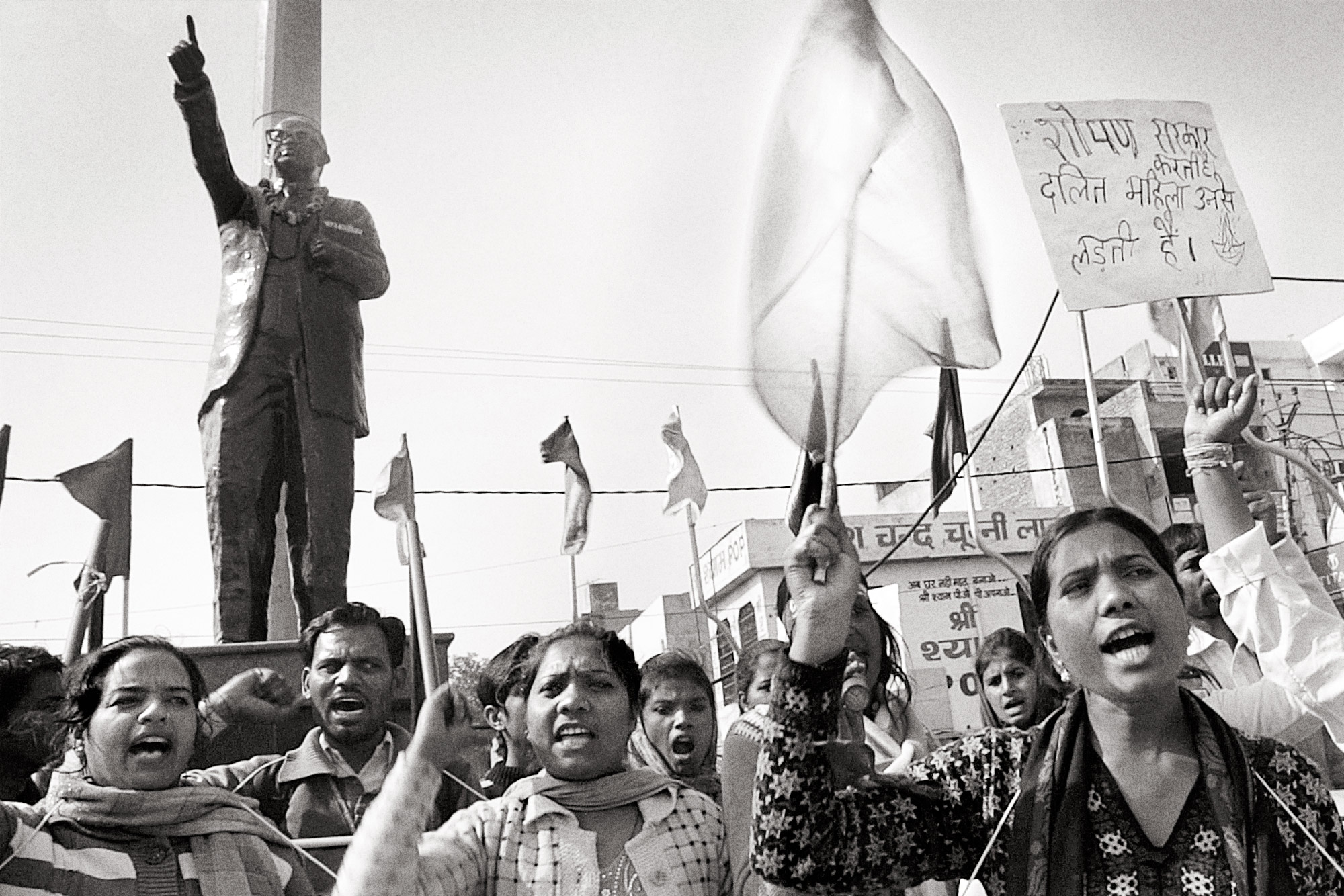
Dalit Women's Swabimaan Self-Respect Yatra in Kurukshetra, 2014

Dalit assertion gained political momentum with the rise of the Bahujan Samaj Party (BSP) in the 1980s.

In 2016, the suicide of Rohith Vemula, a Ph.D. scholar from the University of Hyderabad, sparked nationwide protests and brought attention to caste-based discrimination in higher education.

=== Dalits in Contemporary Politics ===
Dalits have emerged as a significant force in modern Indian politics. The rise of Dalit-based political parties and leaders since the late 20th century has helped reshape democratic representation for historically marginalized communities.

One of the most notable figures is Kanshi Ram, who founded the Bahujan Samaj Party (BSP) in 1984. His vision of a unified "Bahujan" identity—comprising Dalits, OBCs, Adivasis, and minorities—provided a political platform for historically oppressed groups. Mayawati, his protégé, later served four terms as Chief Minister of Uttar Pradesh, the most populous Indian state. Her political rise symbolized Dalit assertion in mainstream governance.

Dalit leaders have also made inroads into national parties. Ram Vilas Paswan, founder of the Lok Janshakti Party, served in several union ministries. In southern India, parties like Viduthalai Chiruthaigal Katchi (VCK), led by Thol. Thirumavalavan, advocate for Dalit rights through Dravidian and Ambedkarite ideologies.

Outside India, Dalit voices have gained traction in international human rights discussions. Organizations such as Equality Labs and the International Dalit Solidarity Network have campaigned against caste-based discrimination globally, including in the diaspora.

== Dalit women in history ==
While caste-based oppression has long affected Dalit communities, Dalit women have borne a disproportionate burden due to the intersection of caste and gender. Historically marginalized in both feminist and anti-caste movements, their stories represent resilience and transformation.

One of the earliest known Dalit women leaders was Dakshayani Velayudhan, the only Dalit woman in the Constituent Assembly of India. She advocated for education, social reform, and the rights of Scheduled Castes. Contemporary voices like Ruth Manorama, Bama Faustina Soosairaj, and Urmila Pawar have enriched Dalit discourse with autobiographical narratives and grassroots activism. Dalit feminism today highlights issues such as sexual violence, landlessness, labour exploitation, and invisibility within mainstream women's movements.

== Timeline of Dalit history ==
Year	Event	Description
c. 1500–1200 BCE	Composition of the Rigveda	Introduction of the varna system via the Purusha Sukta hymn.
c. 500 BCE	Life of Nandanar	Paraiyar devotee of Shiva; earliest recorded Dalit saint in Tamil Nadu.
14th–17th century	Bhakti saints emerge	Chokhamela, Gora Kumbhar, Ravidas challenge caste through devotional poetry.
1873	Jyotirao Phule founds Satyashodhak Samaj	First modern anti-caste reform movement.
1882	Shahu Maharaj reign begins	Pioneering reservations in education/employment for Dalits.
1898	Iyothee Thass revives Tamil Buddhism	Forms Dravida Mahajana Sabha and Oru Paisa Tamizhan newspaper.
1927	Mahad Satyagraha	Ambedkar leads campaign for Dalit right to public water.
1930	Kalaram Temple Entry	Temple access protest in Nashik.
1932	Poona Pact	Agreement between Ambedkar and Gandhi for reserved seats.
1950	Article 17 of the Constitution of India	Abolishes untouchability.
1956	Ambedkar's mass Buddhist conversion	Begins Dalit Buddhist movement with 500,000 followers.
1968	Kilvenmani massacre	44 Dalit workers killed by landlords in Tamil Nadu
1972	Formation of Dalit Panthers	Inspired by the Black Panther Party in the U.S., based in Maharashtra.
1977	Belchhi massacre	11 people, including eight Dalits and 3 from the Sunar caste (a backward caste), were shot and burned alive
1984	Bahujan Samaj Party founded	Kanshi Ram organizes Dalit political platform.
2006	Khairlanji massacre	Four Dalit family members lynched; triggers national protests.
2016	Rohith Vemula's suicide	Student's death exposes casteism in Indian higher education.
2020	Cisco caste discrimination case	First U.S. civil rights lawsuit addressing caste bias.

== Dalit literature and cultural revival ==
Dalit literature emerged as a distinct genre in post-independence India, voicing pain, protest, and self-respect. The ‘Marathi Dalit literary movement’ led the way, with authors like Namdeo Dhasal, Baburao Bagul, and Shantabai Kamble. Anthologies such as ‘‘Poisoned Bread’’ brought Dalit poetry and prose into the mainstream.

Other regional movements followed — Bama and Imayam in Tamil, Joopaka Subhadra in Telugu, and Suraj Pal Chauhan in Hindi — challenging caste hegemony through narratives rooted in lived experience. Dalit literature reclaims subjectivity, defies caste codes, and insists on dignity.

== Land Rights and economic movements ==
Landlessness has historically disempowered Dalits, making them dependent on dominant caste landlords. Movements demanding land redistribution have been critical. The Kilvenmani massacre (1968) in Tamil Nadu, where 44 Dalit agricultural workers were burned alive, became a symbol of caste-class violence.

Post-independence, struggles led by Dalit farmers’ unions, Dalit Shoshit Samaj Sangharsh Samiti (DS4)], and ‘’‘BKU (Ekta-Ugrahan)’’’ called for equitable land rights, wages, and protection from bonded labour. Modern campaigns link economic justice with caste abolition, emphasizing structural reform.

== International awareness ==
According to Minority Rights Group International, Dalits—who number over 200 million in India—continue to face systemic discrimination in access to housing, healthcare, and justice.

The Global Ministries organization notes that caste discrimination also affects Dalit Christians and Dalit Muslims, highlighting its cross-religious impact.

The University of Illinois’s LibGuides on Dalits provide academic resources on Dalit feminism, education, politics, and activism.

=== Caste discrimination in the diaspora ===
Recent years have seen increasing awareness of caste discrimination beyond India. In the United States, South Asian diaspora communities have faced scrutiny for casteism in tech workplaces and universities. The 2020 ‘’‘Cisco caste discrimination lawsuit’’’ in California brought international focus to caste-based bias in corporate settings.

Organisations such as 'Equality Labs' have documented caste prejudice in the diaspora, leading to policy changes in academic institutions (e.g., Brandeis University and California State University system) and anti-caste legislation proposals. These developments affirm that caste, though rooted in South Asia, functions as a global human rights issue.

== Legacy and significance ==
Dalit history is a story of oppression and resistance. It has shaped modern Indian democracy through the struggles for human rights, social justice, education, and political representation. The voices of Dalit writers, activists, and leaders persistently challenge dominant narratives and advocate for an inclusive and equitable future.

== See also ==
- Dalit literature
- Caste system in India
- Caste-related violence in India
- Dalit History Month
- Anti-caste movements
- Ambedkarism

== Bibliography ==
- Anupama Rao (2009). ‘‘The Caste Question: Dalits and the Politics of Modern India’’. University of California Press. ISBN 9780520257610.
- Anurag Bhaskar (2022). ‘‘A Dalit History’’. Aleph Book Company. ISBN 9789393852717. Google Books]
- Sudarshan Ramabadran; Guru Prakash Paswan (2021). ‘‘Makers of Modern Dalit History’’. Penguin Random House. ISBN 9390914442.
- Anand Teltumbde (2018). ‘‘Republic of Caste: Thinking Equality in the Time of Neoliberal Hindutva’’. Navayana. ISBN 9788189059866
- Shailaja Paik (2014). ‘‘Dalit Women's Education in Modern India: Double Discrimination’’. Routledge. ISBN 9780815384144.
- Kancha Ilaiah (1996). Why I Am Not a Hindu: A Sudra Critique of Hindutva Philosophy, Culture and Political Economy’’. Samya. ISBN 8185604827.
- Eleanor Zelliot (2001). ‘‘From Untouchable to Dalit: Essays on the Ambedkar Movement’’. Manohar Publishers. ISBN 8173041431.
- Arjun Dangle (Ed.) (1992). ‘‘Poisoned Bread: Translations from Modern Marathi Dalit Literature’’. Orient Blackswan. ISBN 8125037543.
- Gopal Guru (2009). ‘‘Humiliation: Claims and Context’’. Oxford University Press. ISBN 9780198060307.
- Gail Omvedt (1994). Dalits and the Democratic Revolution: Dr. Ambedkar and the Dalit Movement in Colonial India’’. Sage Publications. ISBN 0803991398.
- Christophe Jaffrelot (2003). ‘‘India's Silent Revolution: The Rise of the Lower Castes in North India’’. Permanent Black. ISBN 9780231127868.
- Teltumbde, Anand. Dalits: Past, Present and Future. Routledge, 2016.
