= Dalit feminism =

Feminism that questions caste and gender roles

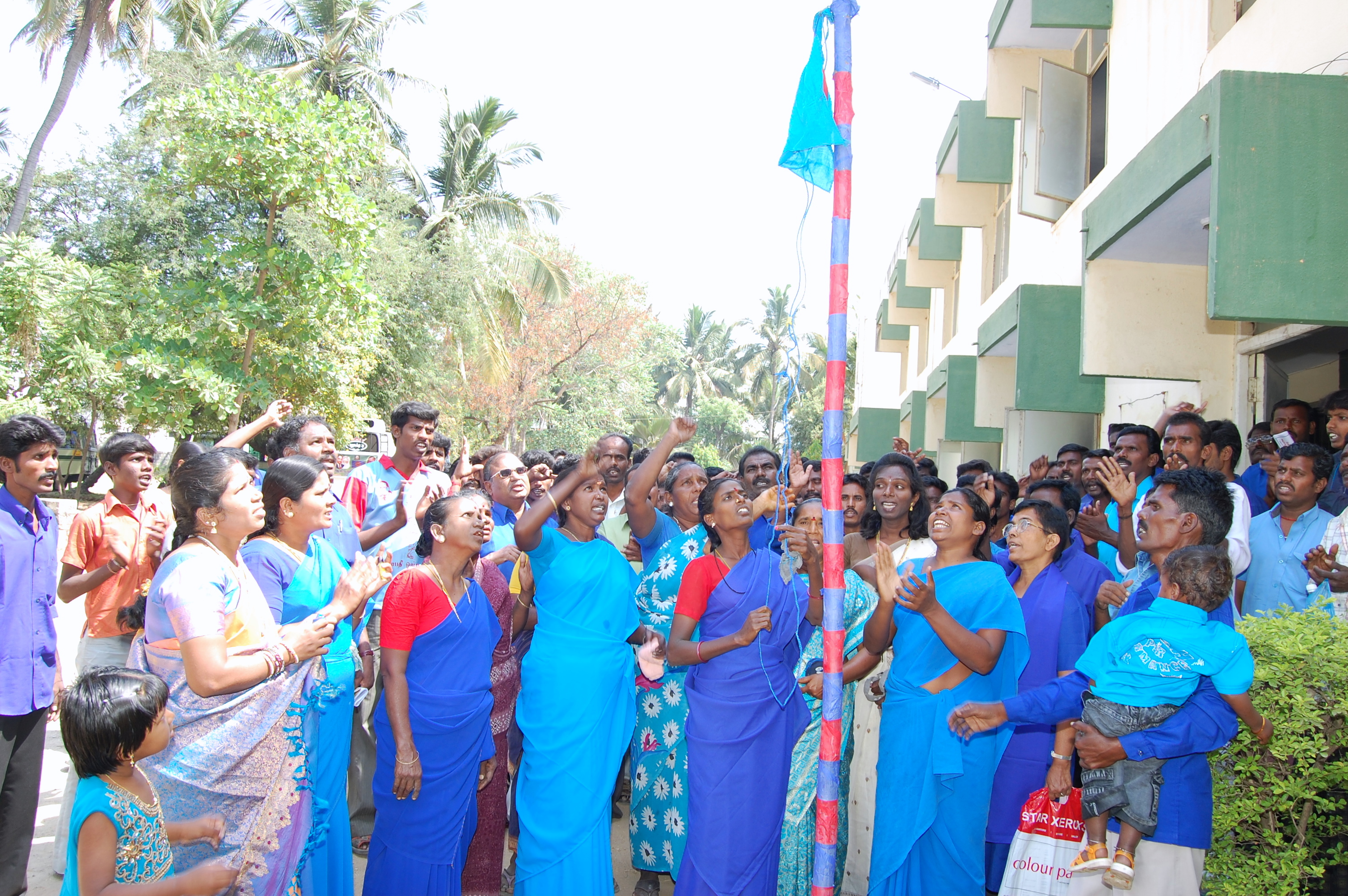
Aathi Thamilar Peravai women's empowerment conference in Salem, Tamil Nadu, 2009.

Dalit feminism is a feminist perspective that includes questioning caste and gender roles among the Dalit population and within feminism and the larger women's movement. Dalit women primarily live in South Asia, mainly in Bangladesh, India, Nepal and Pakistan. Dalit women face different challenges than women in oppressor castes in these countries. They are more likely to be poor, uneducated and socially marginalized. Dalit feminists advocate and have advocated for equal rights for Dalit women based on gender, caste and other issues. They have addressed conferences, created organizations and helped elect other Dalit women into political office.

== Background ==
Dalit women are part of a marginalized group of people who make up part of what are officially known as Scheduled Castes in India, though there are also Dalit women in Nepal, Pakistan, Bangladesh and in Sri Lanka. In Nepal, Dalit women are 13.2% of the population. Most of the Dalit women in Pakistan live in the Punjab region, according to a 1998 census. Overall, Dalit women make up the "largest socially segregated" group of people in the world at 2% of the world's population. Dalit women also tend to live in poverty, and many are illiterate. Dalit women face oppression not only from men belonging to oppressor castes, but also from other Dalit men. In addition, there is a hierarchy among Dalit groups, with some Dalits being higher up on the social scale than others.

Dalit women face violence at higher rates, including types of violence that are specifically done to Dalit women. Certain types of forced prostitution such as the devadasi or jogini system are reserved specifically for Dalit women. In addition, Dalit victims of violence and their families often do not know their rights or are not informed of their rights. The police may show up when a Dalit women reports a violent attack, but they may not investigate or take action to hold the perpetrator responsible. Sexual violence against Dalit women is considered "a regular and routine phenomenon of oppression," according to Kiran Kumar Boddu and Siva Nagaiah Bolleddu, writing in the English Studies International Research Journal. Dalit sexuality has long been "constructed as deviant" by higher castes due to Dalit women's lower caste status. Their bodies were considered "sexually available" by British colonists. In Nepal, a study conducted in 2013 found that 50.6% of Dalit women faced daily forms of violence, including physical and sexual abuse. In addition, many Nepali Dalit women must adhere to the practice of Chhaupadi. In Pakistan, Dalit women face kidnappings and forced conversion to Islam.

Historically, the Dalit rights movement has focused more heavily on Dalit men and Dalit women's issues have often been ignored by mainstream Indian feminism. The larger Indian women's movement, largely run by middle and upper-class women, has been criticized by Dalit women for ignoring issues that they uniquely faced. Feminist academics in India have also ignored the caste issues that Dalit women faced. As expressed by Swaroopa Rani, Indian feminists saw all women as being the same, and therefore having the same problems. Dalit feminists challenge this idea, recognizing feminist politics in India have always been entangled in the politics of “caste, religious community identity, and sexuality”. The varying lived experiences of women of different castes and religious communities undermine the supposed uniformity of the identity of the ‘woman’. Anandita Pan states “intersectional identities of caste/gender and the interwoven nature of practice and theory have constituted the root of Dalit feminism”. At the same time, as scholar Nivedita Menon contends, intersectionality in its American conceptualization cannot be used as a universal framework, rather, Dalit feminist theory should be understood as situated in the temporal and spatial contexts, and lived experiences of Indian women.

== History ==
=== India ===
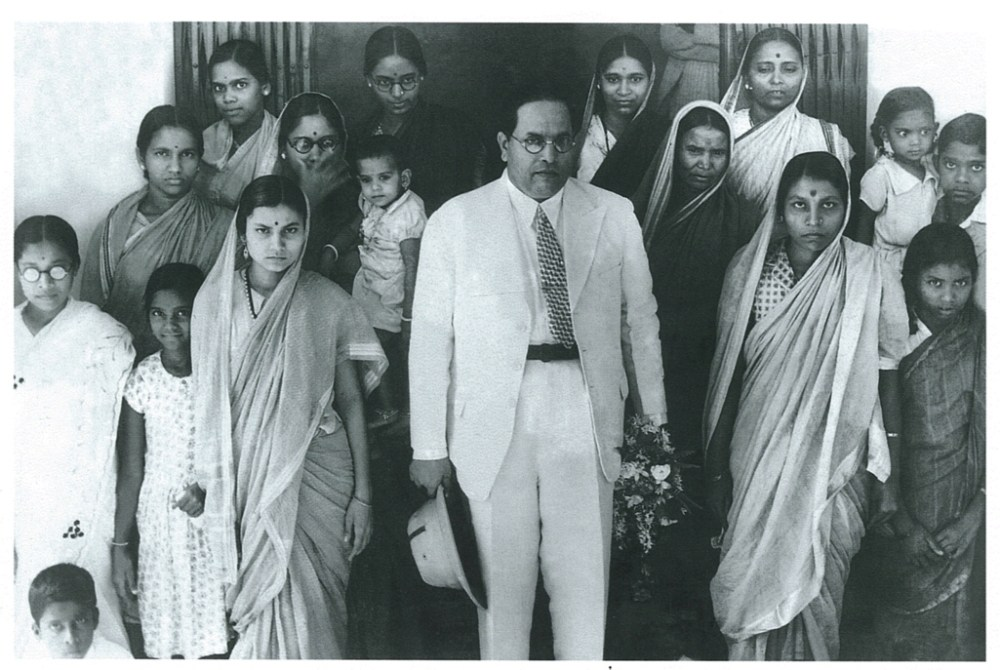
Dr. Babasaheb Ambedkar with Women delegates of the Scheduled Caste Federation during the Conference of the Federation on July 8, 1942, at Nagpur.

In the 1920s, Dalit women were active in anti-caste and anti-untouchability movements. Dalit women were involved in the Non-Brahman movement in the 1930s. These early organizations helped pass resolutions against issues such as child marriage, dowries and enforced widowhood.

In 1942, 25,000 Dalit women attended the All India Depressed Classes Women Conference in Nagpur. President of the conference, Sulochanabai Dongre, advocated for birth control. During the conference, resolutions were passed which advocated for a women's right to divorce, denounced polygamy, improved labor conditions, improved women's involvement in politics and better education for women in lower classes.

Dalit women were also involved in social movements of the 1970s and early 80s. In the 1970s, autobiographies of Dalit women's lives and experiences began to be published. Many of these women were inspired by Babasaheb Ambedkar. Mainstream feminist thought in India during the 1980s and 1990s began to recognize issues surrounding caste. This was a marked change from the various feminist movements in the 70s and 80s which did not address caste issues.

The first national meeting of Dalit women took place in Bangalore in 1987. In the 1990s, several organizations created by Dalit women were formed, such as the National Federation of Dalit Women and the All India Dalit Women's Forum along with several state-level groups. Dalit women were careful to express that these kinds of organizations for Dalit women were not meant to be divisive or separatist, and that there existed a need for continued alliances with Dalit men and non-Dalit women. However, Dalit women also felt that they needed to speak for themselves.

Dalit women sent delegates to the 1993 World Conference against Racism and the 1995 World Conference on Women. Leading up to the World Conference on Women in Beijing, Dalit women had held a national conference in Delhi. For the 2001 World Conference Against Racism, Dalit women advocated that discrimination based on caste be added to language against racism. Adding this type of language would put global pressure on the Indian government. However, in coalition with the United States, the clause to prevent discrimination against Dalit women was dropped in 2001. Despite the clause being dropped, international coverage meant that discrimination based on caste was finally globally recognized.

In 2002, Khabar Lahariya (News Waves), the first newspaper written by and for Dalit women was created. Khabar Lahariya focuses on issues in the Dalit community in their own languages. The newspaper won a UNESCO literacy prize in 2009.

Dalit women participated in critiques of New Economic Policy (NEP) at the 2003 Asian Social Forum and the 2004 World Social Forum (WSF). In 2007, a panel made up of women from Africa and South Asia called "Combatting Caste and Descent and Descent Based Discrimination in Africa and Asia" was discussed at the WSF.

In March 2006, the first National Conference on Violence Against Dalit Women took place in New Delhi. This conference passed the "Delhi Declaration," which laid out how Dalit women faced "disparities in the prevalence of violence, poverty, and sickness" and described the way that dominant castes were responsible for these disparities. In November 2006, there was an International Conference on the Human Rights of Dalit Women held at the Hague. The Hague conference not only addressed violence against Dalit women, but also discussed their own identities and created a sense of group solidarity. Dalit women recognized that they had an identity "forged in 'multiple struggles.'" The Hague conference not only called for the creation of laws to protect human rights for Dalit women, but also that these laws be duly enforced or implemented. Also in 2006, the idea of "Dalit womanism" was created.

=== Nepal ===
Dalit women in Nepal face many of the same issues as Dalit women in India. Throughout post-1990 Nepal, the woman's movement was affected by turbulent politics. A Nepali feminist, Durga Sob, created the Feminist Dalit Organization (FEDO) in 1994. By 2010, FEDO had around 40,000 members and worked to send Dalit children to school and provide training and classes for adults. Women's political parties, while marginalized, have helped push women's rights issues in Nepal. However, these parties are dominated by higher-caste women. Lower-caste women have criticized the party's efforts and pointed out that not all Nepali women face the same problems. FEDO has been involved in helping Dalit women in Nepal become more involved in politics. In 2014, a conference organized by FEDO and held in Kathmandu drew hundreds of Dalit women and included speakers from the United Nations, such as Ziad Sheikh, the Resident Coordinator on Dalit Rights.

=== Pakistan ===
Dalit women in Pakistan are less subject to caste issues, but because most are part of a minority religion in the country, they are persecuted because of their religious backgrounds. However, this doesn't mean there isn't still caste-based discrimination. The first Dalit woman senator in Pakistan, Krishna Kumari Kohli, was elected in 2018.

== Today ==
In the present day, activists such as Ruth Manorama work on legal and political actions to empower Dalit women. Manorama has spoken out about how laws that are meant to protect women in Scheduled Castes and Scheduled Tribes are poorly implemented. Often complaints and reports filed by Dalit women are ignored. In addition, Asha Kowtal of the All India Dalit Mahila Adhikar Manch (AIDMAM) says that India is "stonewalling any discussion on caste." AIDMAM, in conjunction with the Krantijyoti Savitribai Phule Women's Studies Center (KSPWSC), held a 2017 conference called "Dalit Women Speak Out" which attracted around 450 delegates and participants. AIDMAM presented testimonies of gender and caste-based violence at the 38th session of the United Nations Human Rights Council in 2018. The report, called Voices Against Caste Impunity: Narratives of Dalit Women in India and presented to the United Nations (UN), was the first report on caste-based violence against women to be given to the UN.

== Literature ==
Dalit women's writing brings issues of caste identity to feminist literature. Similarly, valid depictions of Dalit women's experiences have been overlooked in the writing of Dalit men. Translations of Dalit literature into English has largely been done by individuals outside of the Dalit experience, and author and translator, Meena Kandasamy, has identified this as a problem, since important nuances in language are often overlooked. Kandasamy has also discussed how, since many of these works deal with politics, they are not seen as true literature.

Prominent women writers of Dalit literature in the Telugu language include Challapalli Swaroopa Rani, Joopaka Subhadra, Jajula Gowri, Swathy Margaret and Gogu Shyamala. These writers have primarily used poetry, short stories, essays and more to challenge the intersectional forms of oppression they faced. Dalit women's literature reveal that systems of caste and gender are connected and particular disadvantages for Dalit women result in experiences of oppression that are distinct from that of upper caste women and Dalit men. Dalit women's autobiographies, such as Baby Kamble's The Prisons We Broke (2008) and P. Sivakami's The Grip of Change can be viewed as protest narratives against the exploitation of Dalit women by upper caste people, as well as the internal gender hierarchies within Dalit families. By establishing Dalit women's identity as that which is affected by mutual and intersecting structures of caste and gender, Dalit women's autobiographies reinforce the Dalit feminism as an intersectional category.

== See also ==
- Dalit
- Feminism in India
- Health care access among Dalits in India
- Rape in India
- Violence against women in India
