= Dalit History Month =

Annual celebration of Dalit history

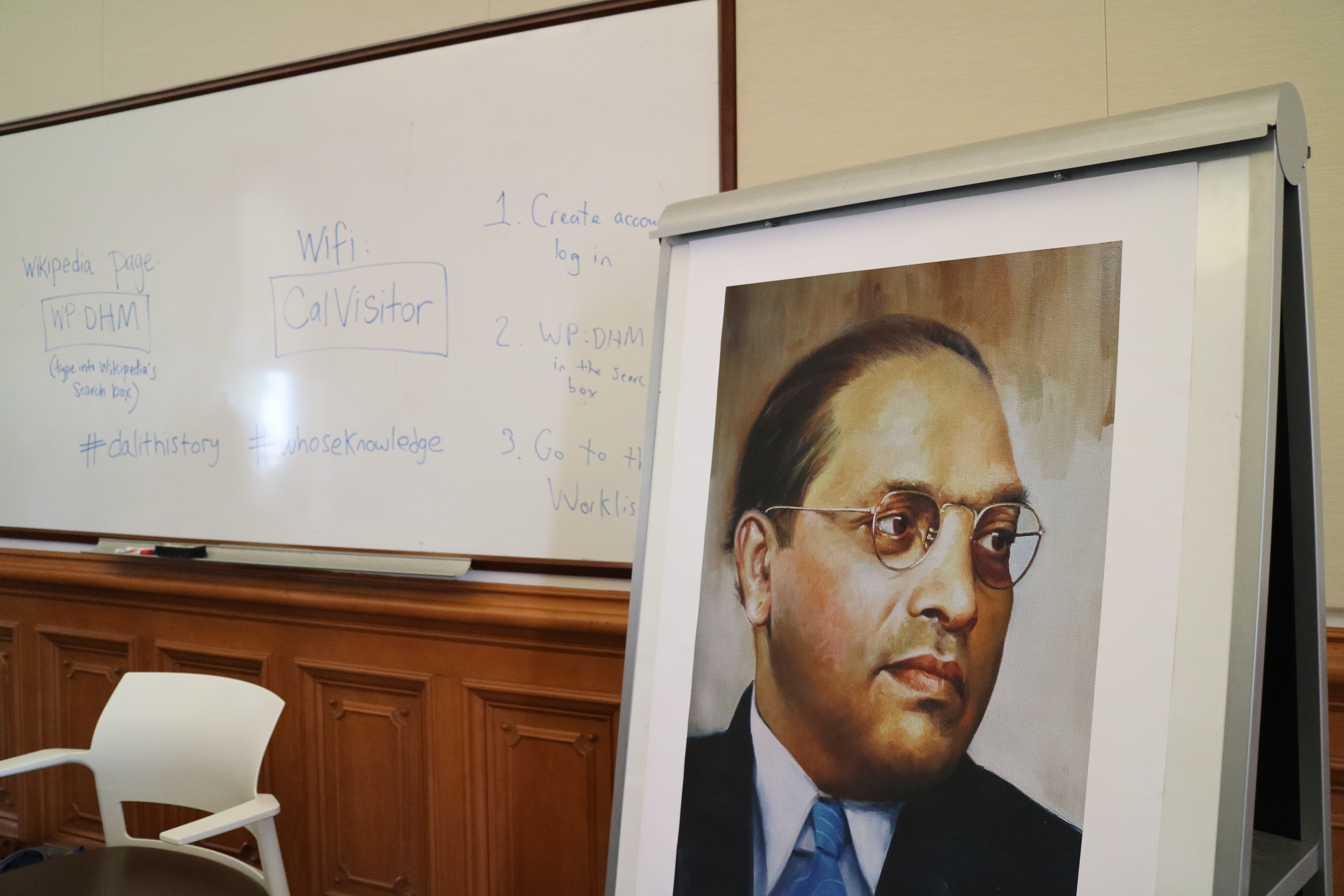
- B. R. Ambedkar portrait at one of the earliest Dalit History Month events
- Observed by: Ambedkarites, Dalits, Anti-caste communities, and others
- Liturgical color: Different shades of Blue
- Type: Cultural, Political
- Significance: Celebration of Dalit history, leaders, movements, and milestones.
- Celebrations: Talks, Lectures, Rallies, Social Media Lives, Public discourses
- Date: April
- Duration: 1 month
- Frequency: Annual
- Started by: The Dalit History Month Collective

Dalit History Month is an annual observance as a way of remembering important people and events in the history of the Dalits or Scheduled Castes and Scheduled Tribes. It is celebrated in April all over the world by Ambedkarites, followers of Dr. B.R. Ambedkar. Discussions, storytelling, history projects, special publications in media, and art works are organized during this month. The Canadian Province of British Columbia recognized April as Dalit History Month.

== History ==
Inspired by Black History Month, a group of Dalit women launched the Dalit History Month project in April 2015. The Dalit History Month collective originally included Thenmozhi Soundararajan, Christina Dhanuja, Maari Zwick-Maitreyi, Sanghapali Aruna, Asha Kowtal, and Manisha Mashaal . Sanghapali Aruna and Thenmozhi Soundararajan came up with the idea during discussions at the Color of Violence conference in Chicago. Dalit History Month is now community-led.

== Significance ==
Dalits are discriminated against because of their caste, despite such discrimination being illegal in India. Ignorance and absence of Dalits in Indian history by mainstream authors is discussed during Dalit History Month. Citizens engage in discussions and reflections on the issues faced by Dalits during this observance. The observance honors figures such as Babasaheb Ambedkar; one of the architects of modern India, whose birth anniversary falls in April—alongside Ramabai Ambedkar, Buddha, Savitribai Phule, Jyotiba Phule, Periyar, Kanshi Ram, freedom fighters Birsa Munda and Uda Devi, Phoolan Devi, Babytai Kamble, Shahuji Maharaj, Fatima Sheikh, Grace Banu, and many others.

In 2022, Canada's British Columbia province has recognised April as Dalit History Month.

In March 2024, the city of Burlington in Ontario Province, Canada, declared April as Dalit History Month and 14 April as Dr. B.R. Ambedkar Day of Equity. Recent research shows, even though Dalits try to promote their history on social media, the social media platforms often reinforce rather than dismantle historical caste inequalities.

== Gallery ==
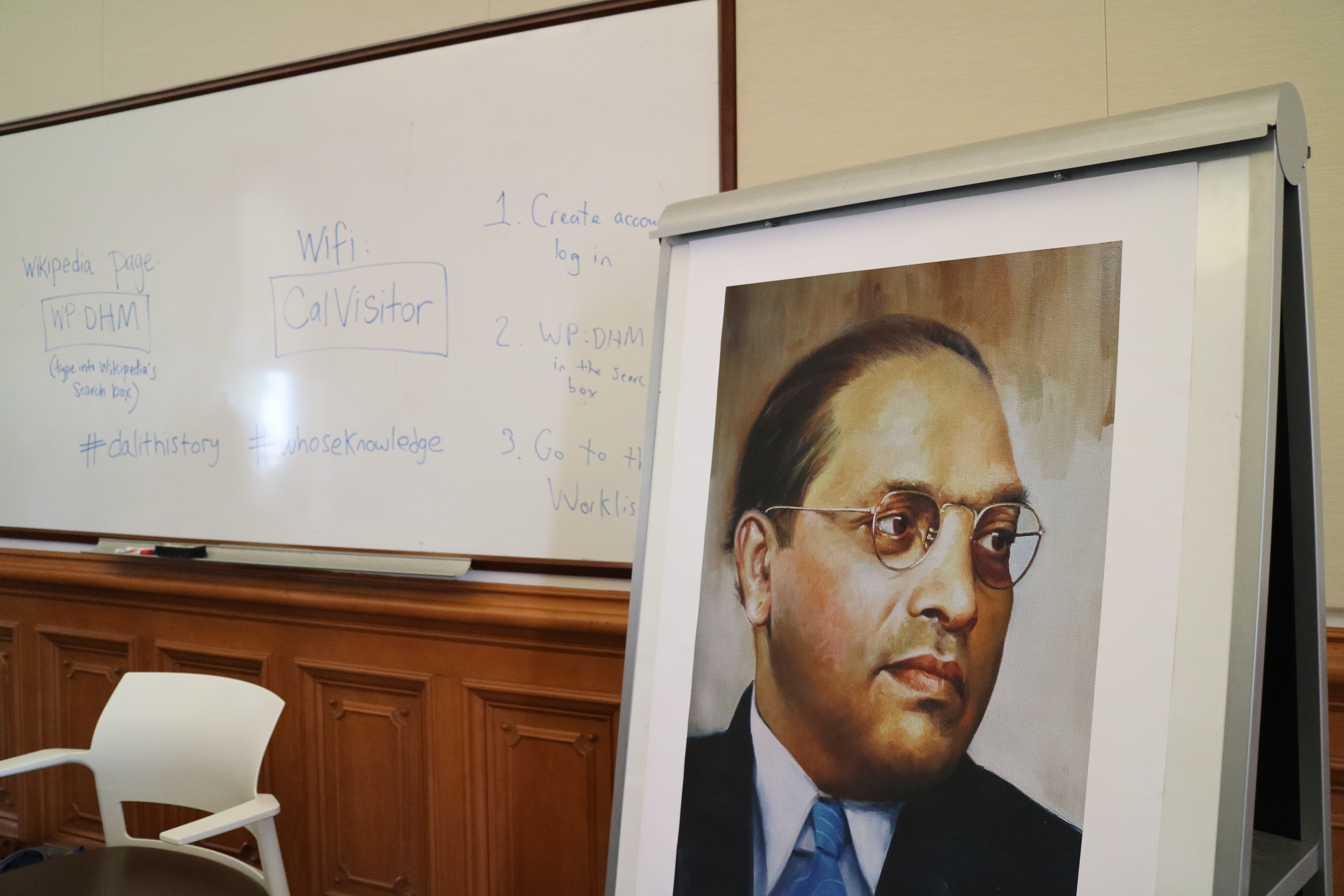
B. R. Ambedkar portrait at Dalit History Month event, 2017

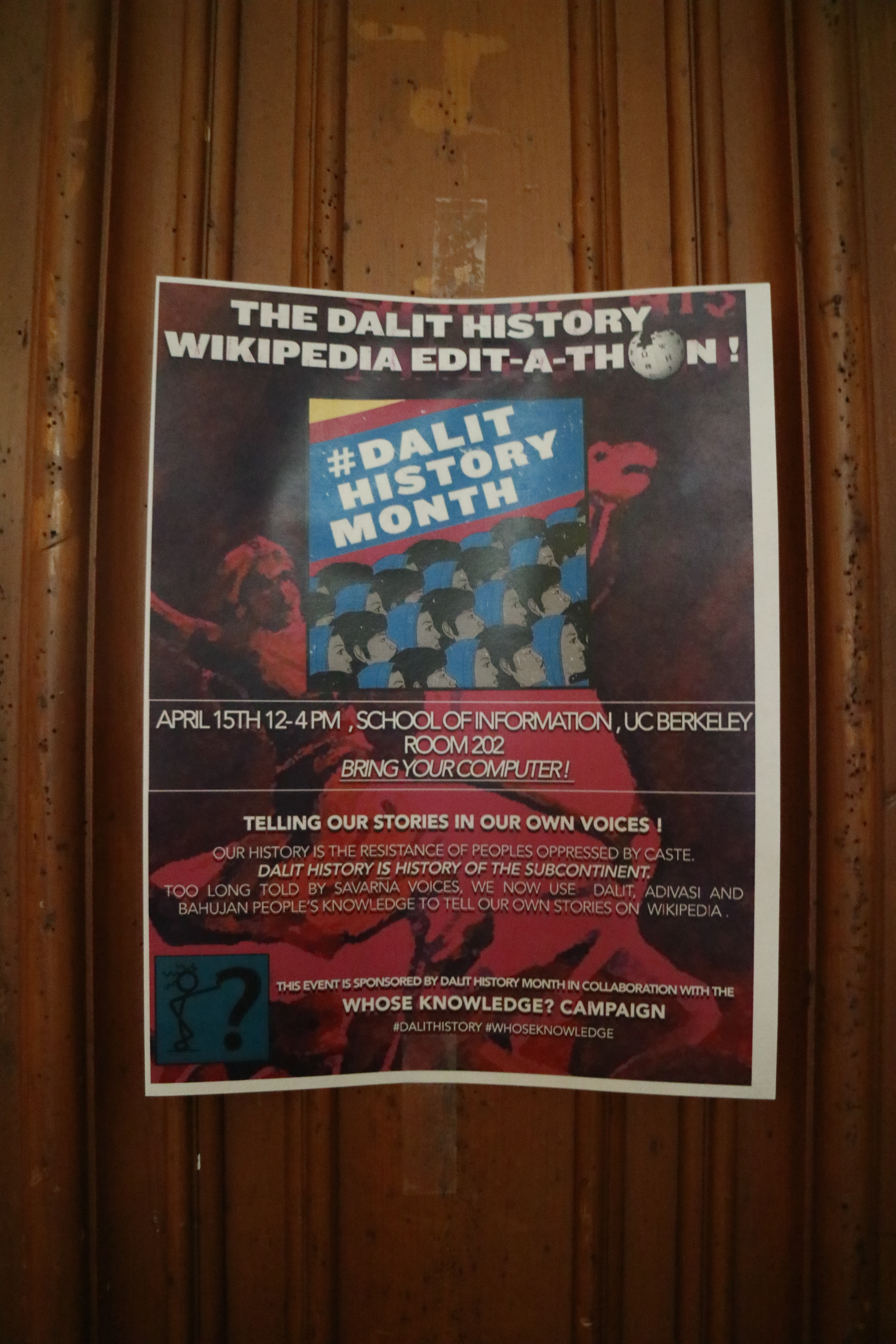
Dalit History Month event poster

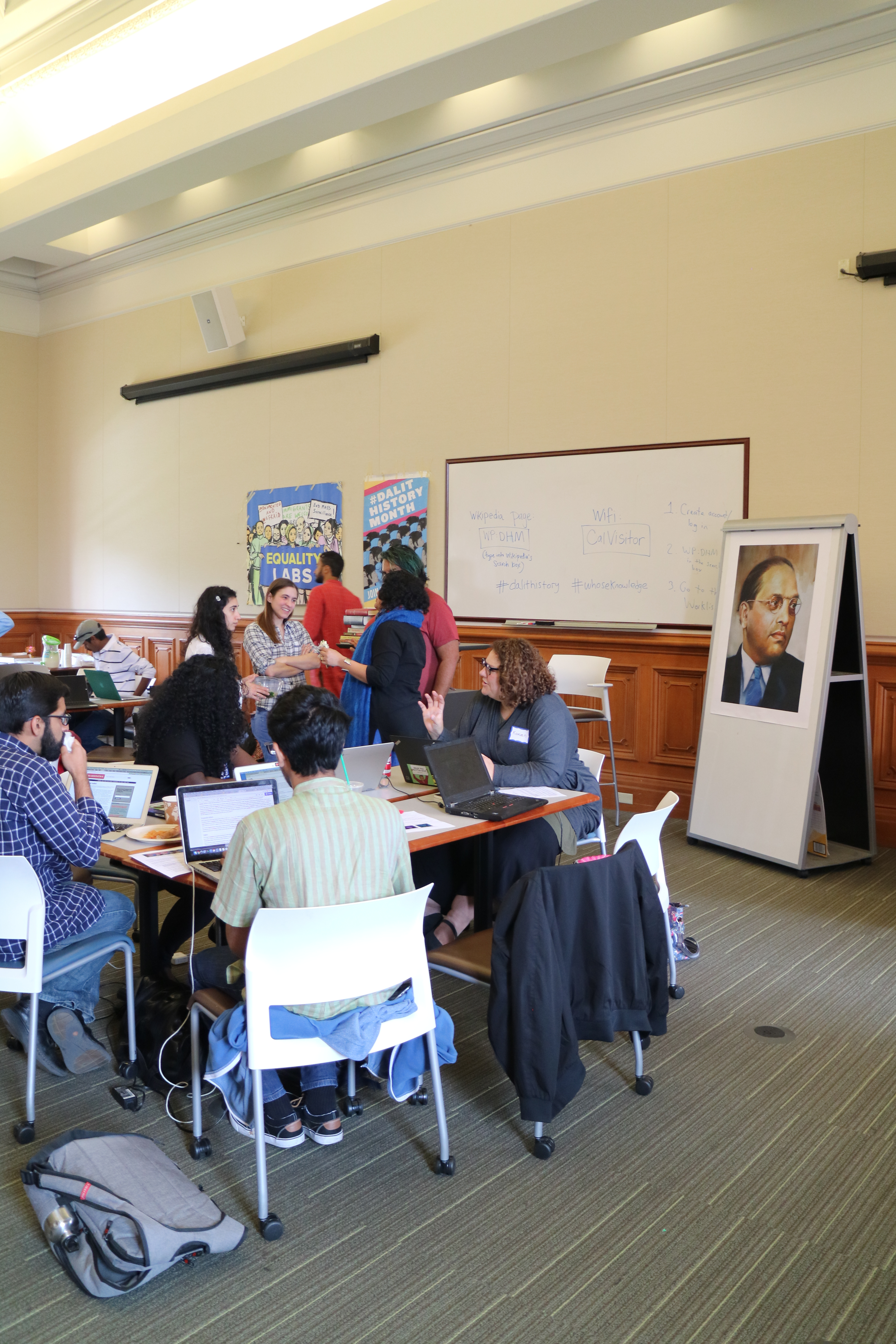
Dalit History Month Editathon at UC Berkeley, April 15, 2017

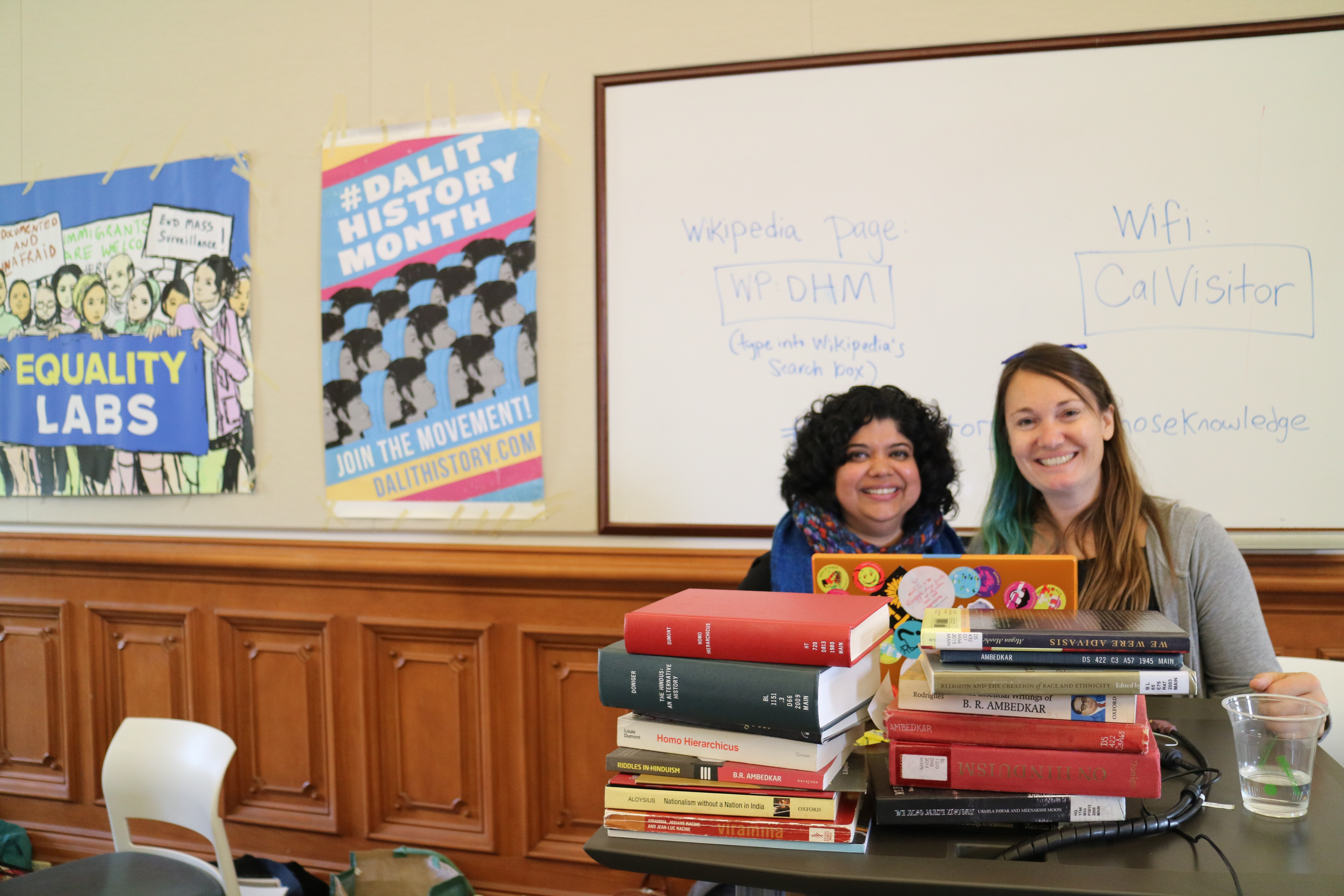
Dalit literature at a Dalit History Month event

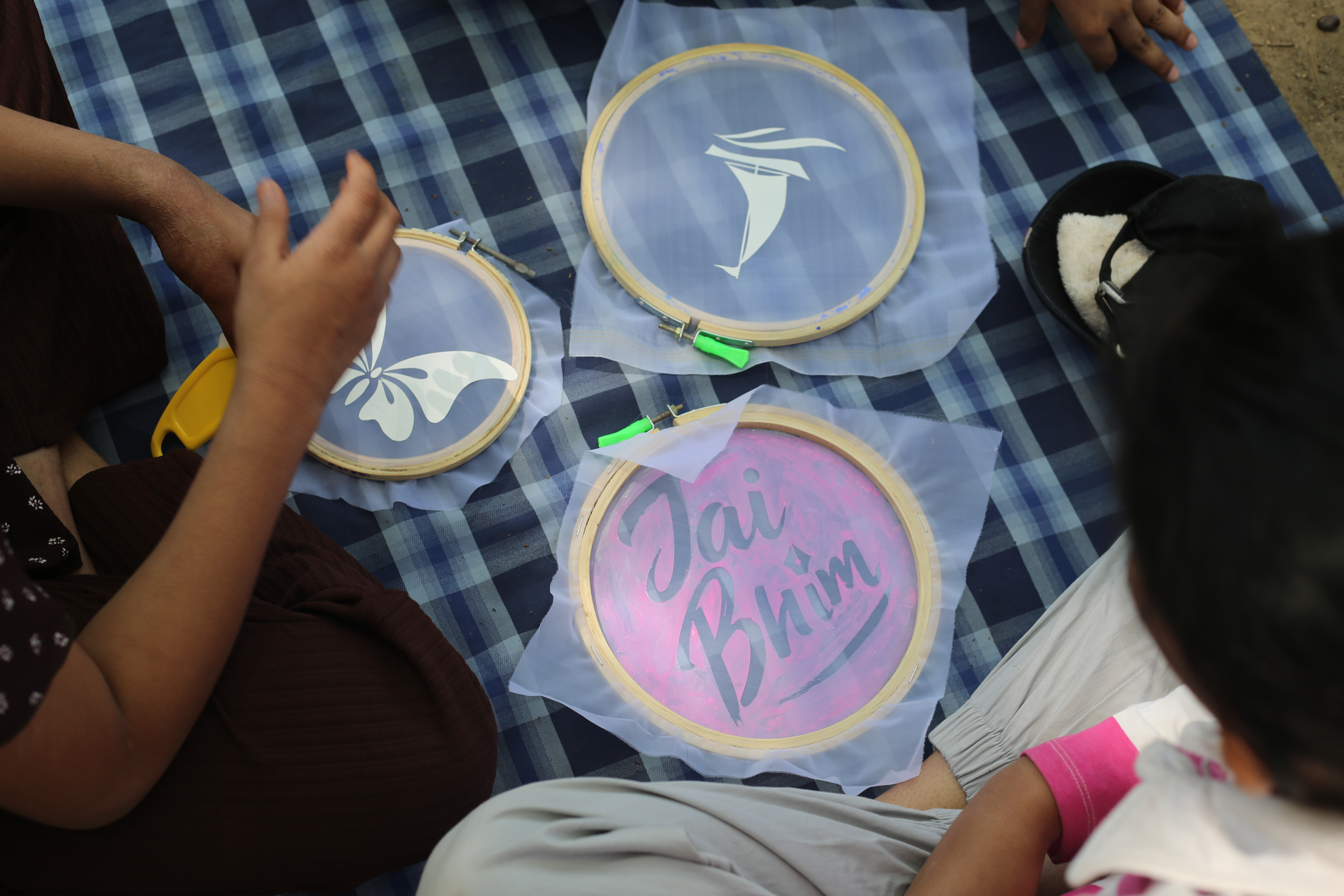
Screen Printing as part of Dalit History Month 2026 celebrations in New Delhi

== See also ==
- April 2018 caste protests in India
- Battle of Koregaon
- Caste system in India
- Caste-related violence in India
- Rashtriya Dalit Prerna Sthal and Green Garden
- Untouchability
