= Thenmozhi Soundararajan =

Indian American Dalit Rights Activist

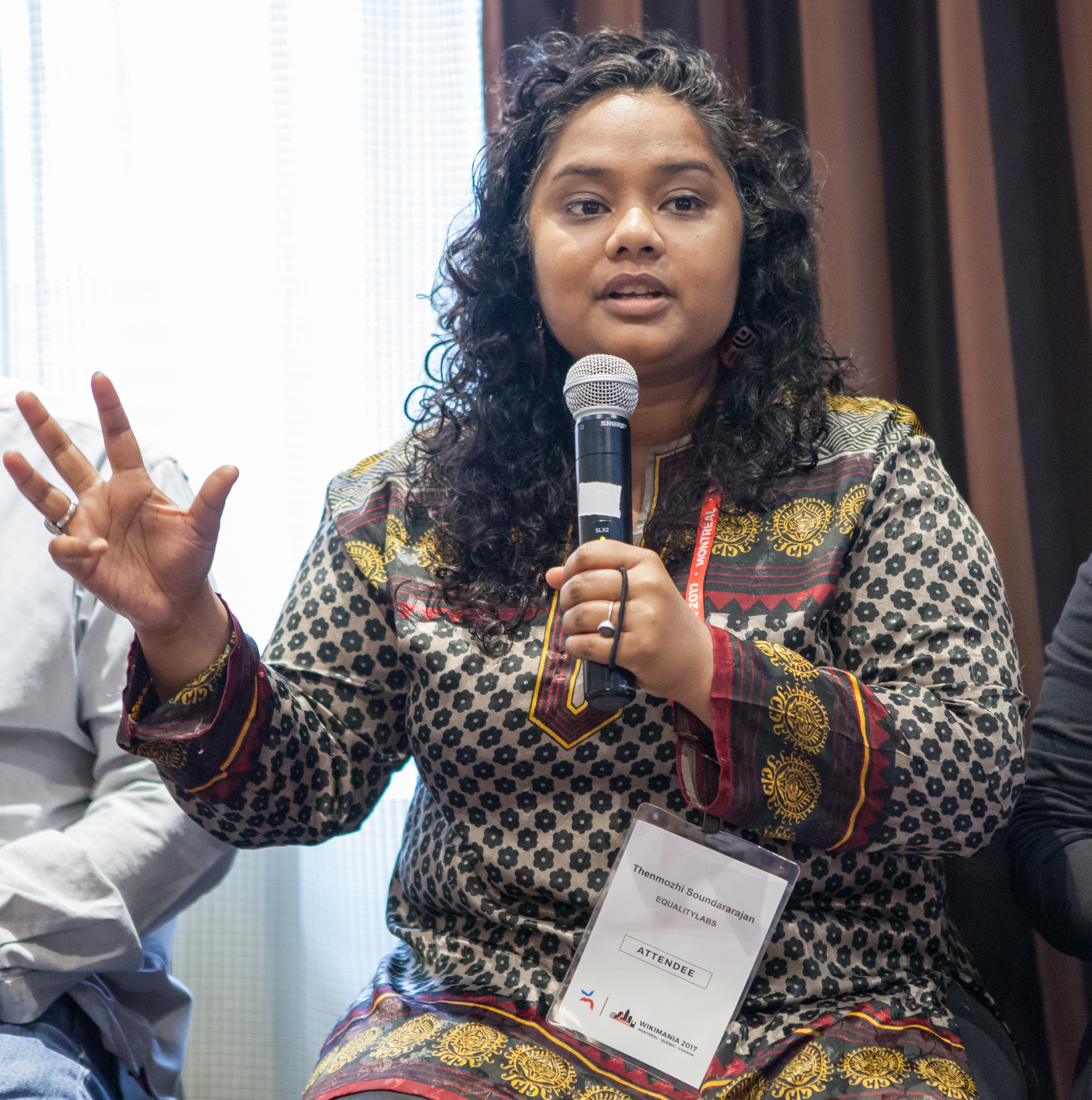
- Thenmozhi Soundararajan at Wikimania 2017
- Born: Oakland, California, United States
- Occupations: Artist; Activist; Author; Public Speaker
- Organization(s): Third World Majority, Media Justice Network, Equality Labs
- Notable work: Trauma of Caste, 2022 Caste in the United States. 2016
- Website: https://dalitdiva.com/

Thenmozhi Soundararajan is an Indian American Dalit rights activist and author based in the United States of America. She is also a transmedia storyteller, songwriter, hip hop musician and technologist. She has been actively campaigning for the rights of the marginalized in the midst of structural casteism. She is the founder of Equality Labs, the largest Dalit civil rights organization in the United States.

Soundararajan is known for her advocacy work against caste discrimination in the United States and India, and for her contributions to the field of media and technology justice. She has co-authored reports on hate speech and disinformation on social media, and has spoken out against caste-based harassment in the tech industry. Soundararajan's book "The Trauma of Caste" explores the intersection of caste, gender, and mental health, and advocates for the recognition and healing of caste soul wounds as a prerequisite for caste abolition. She has also been involved in art and storytelling projects, including the creation of the #DalitWomenFight movement and the curation of Dalit History Month.

== Personal life ==
Soundararajan was born in the United States to parents that migrated from a rural area near Madurai, Tamil Nadu in India. Her father is a doctor and her mother has had a college education, the first woman in her family to have had one. Soundararajan has said that there was inter-caste violence in their village. When Soundararajan was in the fifth grade, after reading about the effects of the Bhopal disaster on the Untouchables, she learned from her mother that she was a Dalit. She was raised with both Hindu and Christian beliefs, but she has eventually chosen to follow Buddhism.

Soundararajan publicly revealed that she was a Dalit when she made a documentary film on caste and violence against women as a part of her college thesis at the University of California, Berkeley. For Soundararajan, this decision had many consequences: while fellow Dalits secretly confided in her about their identity, she has also stated that she faced discrimination from all but one of the Indian professors in her campus and that they refused to advise her on projects.

== Professional life ==
Soundararajan is a filmmaker, transmedia artist and storyteller. Soon after her graduation, she founded a media training organisation called Third World Majority in Oakland, California, which operated between 2001 and 2008. It served as a new media training and production resource centre for women of color, focused on media and technology justice. She was also a co-founder of Media Justice Network, anchored on Third World Majority. She worked with over 300 community organizations across the United States in this context.

She gained media attention in April 2022 when her scheduled talk for Google News employees during Dalit History Month was cancelled due to some employees accusing her of being "Hindu-phobic" and "anti-Hindu". Soundararajan appealed to Google CEO Sundar Pichai, who comes from an upper-caste family in India, but her talk was still cancelled, leading some employees to believe that Google was ignoring caste bias.

== Work at Equality Labs ==
In 2015, Soundararajan founded Equality Labs in Oakland, which is now described as the largest Dalit civil rights organisation in the United States. She co-authored a report that described a survey about caste and caste discrimination in the US, which was the first of its kind in 2016. In May 2019, Equality Labs partnered with South Asian Americans Leading Together (SAALT), API Chaya, and the office of representative Pramila Jayapal to hold a congressional briefing on caste discrimination in the United States in Washington, DC. This briefing was the result of a caste survey that Equality Labs conducted in 2016–2017 to gather quantitative data on the existence of caste within the South Asian diaspora in the US. The organization found that anecdotal data was not enough for thorough advocacy around the issue, and a deeper understanding of how caste operates within the diaspora was needed. During the briefing, Soundararajan and other panelists shed light on the pervasive caste discrimination experienced by Dalits and other marginalized communities in the United States. They shared how on college campuses, "upper" caste students often refuse to share rooms with Dalits, and how Hindu students' associations leave out all those who do not adhere to "upper" caste Hindu practices and culture. Soundararajan's advocacy group, Equality Labs told the Washington Post that more than 250 tech workers had come forward in the wake of the Cisco lawsuit, which brought caste discrimination in the US to the fore, to report incidents of caste-based harassment.

A report by Equality Labs, co-authored by Soundararajan in 2019, analyzed hate speech and disinformation on Facebook India and found that the highest proportion of hate speech – 37% – is linked to Islamophobia, followed by false news (16%), casteist hate speech (13%), and gender/sexuality-related hate speech (13%). Homophobic content was also found to be widely prevalent on Facebook India. Soundararajan has called on Facebook to conduct an independent human rights audit in India, similar to the one they conducted in the United States. She said that Facebook needs to strengthen its content moderation policies to address hate speech and disinformation targeted towards marginalized communities in India.

In April 2020, Equality Labs published a report that Soundararajan co-authored about a coordinated social media campaign in India that was spreading anti-Muslim sentiment in relation to the COVID-19 pandemic. The campaign involved the use of hashtags such as #coronajihad and #biojihad and was traced back to supporters of Prime Minister Narendra Modi and his Bharatiya Janata Party (BJP), as well as the Hindu nationalist paramilitary organization Rashtriya Swayamsevak Sangh (RSS). Soundararajan expressed concern over the partisan nature of the campaign and called on Modi to address the hate speech and disinformation being spread in his name. Data from social media monitoring tools showed that the #coronajihad hashtag alone had over 249,733 interactions on Facebook between March 29 and April 3, with almost 300,000 conversations taking place on Twitter.

In 2022, Soundararajan co-authored a report on misinformation in Asian American and Pacific Islander communities, highlighting how false information is used to push underprivileged groups against one another and foster tensions within the community. The paper cites important practices that contribute to the dissemination of disinformation, such as the Men's Rights Asians movement, casteism, and social media aggregators of Black-on-Asian violence, and underlines that disinformation frequently contributes to the maintenance of white supremacy. Disinformation, according to Soundararajan, dilutes the prospect of a cohesive Asian American bloc, making it less strong. The research also illustrates how internal conflicts are manipulated to advance goals that harm the most vulnerable sections of society. For instance, the Hindu nationalist movement in India, promotes ethnonationalism, exacerbates tensions across caste and religion, and perpetuates disinformation that may run counter to the beliefs of the broader South Asian community and other groups of color. While the report reflects extreme views, Soundararajan warns that fringe movements, even those that start out with just a few followers, could grow to affect local elections and influence larger beliefs and perceptions.

== Art and activism ==
Soundararajan has used storytelling to speak about casteism within the Indian diaspora. Her approach to digital storytelling is informed by her background in Third Cinema, a cinema movement that arose in Latin America in the 1960s with the goal of creating films that challenged prevailing Western aesthetics and ideas. Soundararajan was the inaugural Community Director of the Center for Digital Storytelling's Community Digital Storytelling program, where she pioneered her approach to digital storytelling as a collaborative and community-based activity. She has also consulted with groups such as the National Alliance for Media Arts and Culture and the Gay, Lesbian & Straight Education Network on themes such as social justice, media literacy, and youth empowerment. Soundararajan's collaboration with TWM has received multiple prizes and funding, including those from the Creative Work Fund, the National Association of Latino Arts and Culture, and the Rockwood Leadership Institute. Outlook magazine published her essay and a photo series about her Dalit experience in the United States.

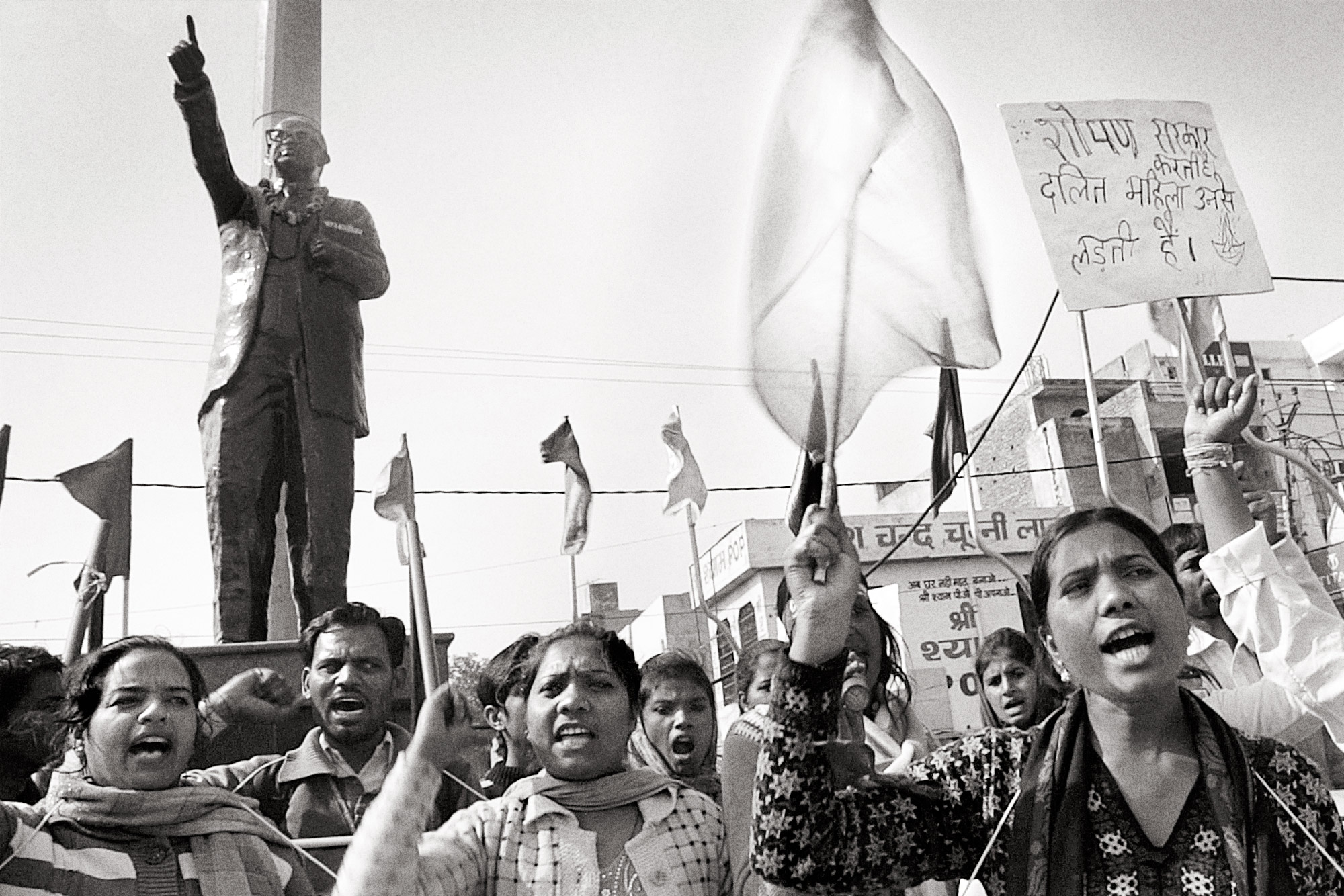
From the #DalitWomenFight Photo Gallery by Thenmozhi Soundararajan

In 2015, the Robert Rauschenberg Foundation included her in their first group of Artist as Activist fellows. She has used this fellowship to work on #DalitWomenFight, a transmedia project and activist movement. Soundararajan published a photoseries about the "Dalit Mahilaswabihmaan Yatra". This was the brainchild of the All India Dalit Mahila Adhikaar Manch where survivors and activists took to marching across India to call out the systemic failure of the Indian government to protect Dalit women and their families.

Soundararajan has been involved in curating and creating Dalit History Month, a participatory radical history project. Its goal is to share Dalit historians' research, which is a deviation from many scholarly projects which have studied Dalit history without leadership or collaboration from Dalits.

In 2018, She created a poster with the slogan "Smash Brahmanical Patriarchy" to draw attention to the vitriol directed towards Dalit activists on Twitter. This poster gained significant attention when a photo of Twitter's former CEO Jack Dorsey holding the sign was circulated online, sparking controversy in India. The photo led to calls for action against Soundararajan and Twitter, ultimately forcing the company to issue an apology for the incident.

=== Music and storytelling ===
She has worked with bassist Marvin Etizioni on her debut blues album, Broken People, which was a collection of liberation songs about people belonging to the Black and Dalit community. Soundararajan, along with Cesar Arvizo, David Huber and Chevy Chen, founded the group Midnight Radio that released an EP called Midnight Radio EP. This group came together during their time in film school, in 2011, and called itself a neo-noir ska/rock/funk group. Under Third World Majority, she started producing musical storytelling videos in 2012. In 2021, Soundararajan started releasing music under her SoundCloud under the name "dalitdiva". In 2020, She began hosting the podcast, "Caste in the USA", in which she explores caste discrimination at American campuses, offices, and households, through conversations with individuals who have first-hand experience with casteism in America.

=== Writing ===
Soundararajan's book "The Trauma of Caste" examines the impact of caste, gender, and mental health on marginalized communities in India. She argues for the importance of reclaiming spirituality and mental health care as tools for fighting caste oppression. Soundararajan also critiques the erasure of caste diversity in the pursuit of ultra-nationalism and advocates for de-Brahminization as a necessary step towards decolonization. She emphasizes the need to recognize and heal caste soul wounds as a prerequisite for caste abolition and calls for solidarity and resilience-building within Savarna communities.

== Works ==
- The Trauma of Caste, North Atlantic Books, 2022. ISBN 9781623177652
