= Caste discrimination in the United States =

Inherited discrimination

Caste discrimination in the United States is a form of discrimination based on the social hierarchy which is determined by a person's birth. Though the use of the term caste is more prevalent in South Asia and Bali, in the United States, South Asian Americans also use the term caste.

Caste is not officially recognized by law in the United States, except in Seattle, Washington. On February 21, 2023, Seattle became the first U.S. jurisdiction to add caste to its list of categories protected against discrimination. In other places such as California, caste is implicitly covered as a subset of other categories under anti-discrimination laws.

== Overview ==
=== History of caste in the United States ===
The U.S. Naturalization Act of 1790 limited citizenship to "free white persons," forcing immigrants to determine their racial classification in federal courts. In 1910, the Asiatic Exclusion League argued that people of Asian origin should be denied citizenship through naturalization. The league described Hindu ancestry as "enslaved, effeminate, caste-ridden, and degraded" and Hindus as the "slaves of Creation."

In 1913, A. K. Mozumdar, an immigrant from Bengal living in Washington State, applied for United States citizenship. Mozumdar argued that as a high-caste Hindu of what he described as Aryan descent, he shared racial origins with Europeans. His application was accepted, making him one of the earliest South Asian immigrants to obtain U.S. citizenship.

In 1953, W. Norman Brown, founder of the Department of South Asian Studies at the University of Pennsylvania, wrote that "a large number of Americans...have a picture of India as a land of meditating omphalopsychites, hypnotic swamis, naked ascetics, bejewelled princes of fabulous wealth and incomparable harems, gross superstition, bare-skinned, poverty-stricken, famine-ridden masses, where everyone is a beggar and caste is more important than life."

Caste discrimination may have accompanied immigrants to the US from India, Nepal and other South Asian countries. Based on the 2017 American Community Survey, about 5.9 million South Asians live in the U.S. Despite being one of the fastest-growing immigrant groups, caste discrimination may be underreported despite its potential influence on job opportunities and marriage prospects among South Asian immigrants. Indian migrants account for a large number of high-skilled workers in STEM fields, which could lead to an issue of caste discrimination in the workplace in areas such as Silicon Valley. Thenmozhi Soundararajan, executive director of Equality Labs, said, “Wherever South Asians go, they bring caste."

=== Race and caste ===
Several observers see parallels between race in the United States and caste. When Martin Luther King, Jr. visited India in 1959, he was introduced by the principal of a school with Dalit students (then called "untouchables") as a "fellow untouchable from the United States of America". Although taken aback by this description, King agreed with it after reflection, thinking, "Yes, I am an untouchable, and every Negro in the United States of America is an untouchable."

In Caste: The Origins of Our Discontents, Isabel Wilkerson argues that racial stratification in the United States is best understood as a caste system, akin to those in India and in Nazi Germany.

Caste activists in India have found common ground with the struggles of African Americans in the US. The activist group Dalit Panthers was inspired by the American Black Panther Party.

=== Legal position ===
Caste is not explicitly recognized as a category under most anti-discrimination laws in the U.S. According to some commentators, this was because caste was an unknown concept when these laws were originally passed. It has come to light only in recent times due to reports of discrimination. Others have said that categories such as ancestry as in California law already cover caste discrimination. Legal scholars have also argued that caste discrimination is cognizable as race discrimination, religious discrimination, and national origin discrimination.

In August 2002, the UN Committee for the Elimination of Racial Discrimination approved a resolution condemning caste or descent-based discrimination.

In February 2023, Seattle became the first city in the United States to explicitly ban caste-based discrimination.

==== California Senate Bill 403 ====
In 2023, California State Senator Aisha Wahab introduced SB 403 to include caste in the list of legally protected categories against discrimination. The bill defined caste as "an individual's perceived position in a system of social stratification on the basis of inherited status," which could be determined by several factors including the "inability or restricted ability to alter inherited status; socially enforced restrictions on marriage, private and public segregation, and discrimination; and social exclusion on the basis of perceived status." SB 403 proposed to add caste to the existing anti-discrimination protections in housing, employment, and public education. The bill did not mention a specific ethnicity or religion. It was supported by some Dalit rights groups and opposed by some Hindu organizations, the latter claiming that the bill was unnecessary and unfairly singled out Hindu Americans.

The state legislature approved the bill, but it was vetoed by Governor Gavin Newsom, who declared that the pre-existing anti-discrimination laws already prohibited caste discrimination.

== Studies on caste in the United States ==
According to a 2003 study by the Center for the Advanced Study of India at the University of Pennsylvania, 1.5% of Indian immigrants were Dalits or members of lower classes. Another 2016 study found that the 'high' or 'dominant' castes make up more than 90% of Indian migrants. (Note: In contrast, in India only 4% identify themselves as Brahmin, and 26% as General Category, which means that 70% of the population is from non-dominant castes.)

The Carnegie Endowment for International Peace published a study in 2021 and reported that the majority of respondents (53%) do not identify with caste, especially among those born in America. Of those that identified with a caste (47%), roughly 1% each identified with scheduled caste (dalit) and scheduled tribe (adivasi) categories.

A survey on caste discrimination conducted by Equality Labs (Note: Described as a "Dalit rights organisation" and as "a nonprofit organization focused on ending what it calls caste apartheid".) found 67% of Indian Dalits living in the U.S. reported that they faced caste-based harassment at the workplace, with 27% reporting verbal or physical assault based on their caste. The survey also documents personal anecdotes about discrimination and isolation at schools, workplaces, temples and within communities. The Carnegie Endowment researchers pointed out that the study used a non-representative snowball sampling method to identify participants, which might have skewed the results in favour of those with strong views about caste.

The Equality Labs study in the US found that those from lower castes "fear retaliation and worry about being "outed" and hence "hide their caste." However, a significant portion of Indians in the US deny ever facing caste discrimination. The Carnegie Endowment study, using a sample from YouGov, found 5% of Indian Americans reporting they faced caste discrimination. (Note: This compares with 1–2% people identifying with scheduled castes/tribes.) A third of them said that they faced discrimination from other Indian Americans, another third said they faced it from non-Indian Americans, and a final third said that they faced it from both Indian and non-Indian Americans. The researchers found this response perplexing as non-Indians would not have had caste as a salient category.

Homophily based on caste, i.e., tendency to associate with the people of the same caste, was reported by 21% of the respondents; 24% said that they did not know the caste of the people they associated with. The remainder said that they associate with some or most people of their caste (23% and 31% respectively).

The Ambedkar King Study Circle collected testimonies from Dalit workers about alleged discrimination from Indian colleagues.

== Discrimination issues ==
=== Discrimination issues in the workplace ===
The existence of caste discrimination in the US tech sector was acknowledged by a group of Dalit female engineers from Microsoft, Google, Apple and other tech companies.

Ambedkar King Study Circle (AKSC), a US based activist group, along with 15 other organizations, sent an appeal to top American companies including Google, Apple, Microsoft demanding that the CEOs intervene immediately to address the issue of caste discrimination. The AKSC wanted the companies to bring in caste sensitivity training similar to the gender, race, sexuality training practices. AKSC emphasized fair and equal opportunity recruitment, retention and appraisal policies.

In May 2021, the Federal Bureau of Investigation raided Akshardham in Robbinsville Township, New Jersey to investigate slavery and forced labor of lower caste Indian workers. The workers were brought to the U.S. on religious visas. The FBI removed about 90 workers from the site.

In April 2022, Google cancelled a planned talk by Thenmozhi Soundararajan as part of its Diversity Equity and Inclusivity programme. It was allegedly done under pressure from employees, accusing her of being Hinduphobic and anti-Hindu. Some felt their lives would be endangered if the talk went ahead. Rather than bringing their community together, it caused division and rancor, according to the Google spokesperson. The senior Google manager who invited Soundararajan resigned over the incident.

=== Cisco lawsuit ===
In 2020, caste-based discrimination issues in Silicon Valley came to the surface with a lawsuit by the State of California against Cisco Systems filed by the California Civil Rights Department (CRD, earlier called Department of Fair Employment and Housing). The Department sued Cisco and two of its senior engineers in managerial positions for discrimination against a Dalit engineer. The allegations were that the Dalit engineer received lower wages and "fewer opportunities" because of his caste. The "fewer opportunities" is an apparent reference to a leadership position that the Dalit engineer felt entitled to.

After an initial filing in a federal district court, the Department refiled the case in Santa Clara County Superior Court in 2021. Cisco filed a demurrer asking for dismissal on the grounds that caste and ethnicity were not protected categories under the Fair Employment and Housing Act of California. The Ambedkar International Center and other Dalit organizations filed an amicus curiae brief, arguing that the California law does in fact prohibit caste discrimination.

In April 2023, California Civil Rights Department "voluntarily dismissed" (withdrew) the case against the accused managers, while continuing to proceed against Cisco. Multiple explanations have been offered for this withdrawal. According to the Associated Press, the case was dismissed by an order of the court. (Note: If it was dismissed by the court then the meaning of "voluntary dismissal" by the Department becomes unclear.) According to a civil rights think tank called "Caste Files", the Department was forced to withdraw the case due to a motion of sanctions filed by the accused managers. If the motion went ahead it would have "exposed the loopholes" in the case while the political battle for SB 403 bill was ongoing. The Press Trust of India highlighted the supposed loopholes, stating that, according to court filings, the lead manager himself had actively recruited the Dalit engineer, giving him a generous package, with full knowledge of his caste background. He had also recruited other Dalit engineers, and the engineer chosen for a leadership position in preference to the alleged victim was also a Dalit engineer. The Hindu American Foundation (HAF) claimed to have reviewed the case files and declared that the California department's narrative was full of lies.

The HAF also filed a case in a federal court charging the California department of infringement of civil rights of Hindus through its assertion that Hinduism mandates caste discrimination. The federal court ruled against HAF but allowed to amend its complaint. Meanwhile, the California department also amended its case removing references to caste and Hinduism, thereby obviating HAF's involvement in it.

The Civil Rights Department faced further setbacks. Cisco's motion to compel document production was granted and CRD was charged a penalty. The "unscientific" Equality Labs survey was thrown out as evidence. The anononymity clause for the alleged victim of discrimination was struck down. In court testimonials, Cisco exposed the alleged victim, leading the court to observe "the lack of specific and current evidence of harm". Sundar Iyer, the senior manager accused of discrimination, went public with allegations of unethical practices against the CRD. He stated that the CRD assigned him a religion and a caste ("Hindu Brahmin") without him identifying as either. It also claimed that the alleged victim was the only Dalit on his team, which was untrue.

=== Discrimination issues in education ===
In 2015, California State Board of Education initiated a regular ten-year public review of the school curriculum framework. According to the coalition South Asian Histories for All, The Hindu American Foundation (HAF) and a coalition of other Hindu activists sought to erase the word "Dalit" from the syllabus. According to HAF, their suggested change was not to remove the word "Dalit," but to distinguish between varna and jati.

In 2021, the student body of California State University system, representing half a million students, passed a resolution seeking a ban on caste-based discrimination. The campaign was spearheaded by Prem Pariyar, a Nepali origin Dalit student, who came to the US in 2015 escaping persecution in his home country, and claimed that he faced discrimination in the US as well. For the affected students, casteism is manifested through slurs, microaggressions and social exclusion. The resolution cited the survey by Equality Labs where 25 percent of Dalits reported having faced verbal or physical assaults. Al Jazeera noted that the resolution was authored by a higher caste student and backed by other students from other racial and religious groups.

In January 2022, the Board of Trustees of the California State University responded, announcing that they added "caste" as a protected category in the university's anti-discrimination policy. The change was subtle, according to CNN. The word "caste" was added in parentheses after the term "race and ethnicity". A group of faculty in the university had written to the Board of Trustees citing lack of due diligence in instituting the measure. They said that the existing policy of the university, which covers national origin, ethnicity and ancestry, already provided adequate protection, and claimed that the new measure would result in singling out and targeting the Hindu faculty. But for the advocates and student leaders who campaigned for it for over two years, it was a civil rights victory.

In December 2022, Brown University became the first Ivy League institution to add caste to its nondiscrimination policy. Brown's vice president for Institutional Equity and Diversity noted that caste was covered under existing nondiscrimination policies, "but we felt it was important to lift this up and explicitly express a position on caste equity.”

== See also ==
- Caste system among South Asian Muslims
- Caste system among South Asian Christians
- Caste system in Sikhism
- Caste system in India
- Caste system in Pakistan
- Caste system in Nepal
- Caste system in Sri Lanka
- Discrimination in the United States
