= SAALT =

SAALT may refer to:

- South Asian Americans Leading Together, a U.S.-based nonprofit organization advocating for civil rights and social justice for South Asian communities
- South Australian Aboriginal Lands Trust, a statutory body established to manage and hold land in trust for Aboriginal South Australians

== See also ==
- Salt (disambiguation)
