= Iyothee Thass =

Indian anti-caste activist and a practitioner of Siddha medicine

C. Iyothee Thass Pandithar
- Born: Kathavarayan; 20 May 1845; Madras, Madras Presidency, British India (now Chennai, Tamil Nadu, India)
- Died: 5 May 1914 (aged 68)
- Occupations: Siddha physician; linguist; social justice activist; journalist; philosopher; anthropologist
- Known for: South Indian Sakya Buddhist movement

C. Iyothee Thassa Pandithar (Born Kathavarayan; 20 May 1845 – 1914) was an Indian anti-caste activist and a practitioner of Siddha medicine. He famously converted to Buddhism and called upon the Paraiyars to do the same, arguing that this was their original religion. He also founded the Panchamar Mahajana Sabha in 1891 along with Rettamalai Srinivasan. Panchamas are the ones who are outcastes.

"Iyothee Thass" is the most common Anglicized spelling of his name; other spellings include Pandit C. Ayodhya Dasa, C. Iyothee Doss, C. Iyodhi Doss, C. Iyothee Thoss, K. Ayōttitācar (avarkaḷ), K. Ayōttitāsa (paṇṭitaravarkaḷ), or Ayothidas Pandithar.

== Early life ==
Iyothee Thass was born Kathavarayan on 20 May 1845 in Thousand Lights, a neighbourhood in Madras (now Chennai), and later migrated to the Nilgiris district. His family followed Vaishnavism and on that basis he named his children Madhavaram, Pattabhiraman, Janaki, Raman and Rasaram. His grandfather worked for George Harrington in Ootacamund (now Ooty) and little Kathavarayan profited immensely from this association.

Iyothee Thass possessed deep knowledge in Tamil, Siddha medicine and philosophy, and literary knowledge in languages such as English, Sanskrit and Pali.

== Early Activism (1870 - 1900) ==
In 1870, Iyothee Thass founded Adhvaidhananda Sabha, considered one of his early institution-building activities. Later, in 1891, he established the Dravida Mahajana Sabha and organized its First Conference in Ooty. The conference addressed issues such as enacting criminal laws against the humiliation of untouchables and providing education and employment opportunities for them. Iyothee Thass actively engaged with the colonial census and sought recognition for the Depressed Classes as Adi-Tamilar, distinct from Hinduism.

In the 1870s, Iyothee Thass organized the Todas and other tribes of the Nilgiri Hills into a formidable force. In 1876, Thass established the Advaidananda Sabha and launched a magazine called Dravida Pandian in collaboration with Rev. John Rathinam.

In 1886, Thass issued a revolutionary declaration that Scheduled caste people (Dalits) were not Hindus. Following this declaration, he established the "Dravida Mahajana Sabha" in 1891. During the 1891 census, he urged the members of Scheduled castes to register themselves as "Casteless Dravidians" instead of identifying themselves as Hindus. His activities served as an inspiration to Sri Lanka's Buddhist revivalist Anagarika Dharmapala.

=== Conversion to Buddhism ===
Iyothee Thass met Colonel H. S. Olcott with his followers and expressed a sincere desire to convert to Buddhism. According to Thass, the Paraiyars of Tamilakam were originally Buddhists and owned the land which had later been robbed from them by Aryan invaders. With Olcott's help, Thass was able to visit Ceylon and obtain diksha from the Sinhalese Buddhist monk Bikkhu Sumangala Nayake. On returning, Thass established the Sakya Buddhist Society in Madras with branches all over South India. The Sakya Buddhist Society was also known as the Indian Buddhist Association and was established in the year 1898.

Identifying the caste system's origin with the decline of Buddhism, Iyothee Thass urged Dalits to return to Buddhism for the annihilation of caste. In 1898, he embraced Buddhism during a visit to Sri Lanka and founded 'The Sakya Buddhist Society.' The society established branches in various locations, including South Africa and Sri Lanka. Iyothee Thass's efforts aimed at constructing a casteless identity for Dalits. He emphasized the need to record Buddhism as their religion in the census, challenging the established caste hierarchy.

== Later life and work (1900 - 1914) ==
On 19 June 1907, Iyothee Thass launched a weekly Tamil newspaper called Oru Paisa Tamizhan or One Paise Tamilian and Dravidia Pandian, later known simply as The Tamilan, which he ran until his death in 1914. This newspaper became the main instrument of his criticism against caste power. In addition to hosting Iyothee Thass' editorials, the newspaper gave a voice to the public, including members of the Dalit community, who had the opportunity to publish articles on areas such as "religion, law, Tamil literature, economy, agriculture and a Ladies Column". The newspaper enjoyed a wide reach among marginalized communities and took an explicit anti-caste stance, also reflected in its refusal to use caste names.

Iyothee Thass fought (unsuccessfully) with the Madras Mahajana Sabha for the right of Parayars to enter Vishnu and Shiva temples, traditionally denied to Dalit communities, and advocated with the British for free education up to the fourth grade and allocation of unused lands to oppressed Parayars.

Iyothee Thass died on 5 May 1914, just two weeks before his 69th birthday.

== Brahmanisation of Thiruvalluvar ==
Iyothee Thass claimed that his grandfather Kandappan worked as a butler of George Harrington, a European Civil Servant possibly in Madurai district. During the same time, Francis Whyte Ellis, a British civil servant in the Madras Presidency and a scholar of Tamil and Sanskrit who had established a Tamil sangam (academy) in Madras in 1825 and asked Tamil enthusiasts to "bring to him ancient Tamil manuscripts for publication". Between 1825 and 1831, Kandappan discovered handwritten manuscripts of the Thirukkural as well as the Tiruvalluva Maalai (a hagiographic anthology of Valluvar and his work) and the Naaladi Naannurru (also known as Naalatiyaar, a poetry collection from the Sangam period). According to popular sources, Kandappan preserved the works from destruction after finding the manuscripts written on palm leaves in a pile of leaves used for cooking. Kandappan had them delivered to Ellis.

The books were finally published in print for the first time in 1831 thanks to the collaboration between Ellis, his manager Muthusamy Pillai, and Tamil scholar Tandavaraya Mudaliar. The 1831 and 1834 editions published by Ellis did not mention Thiruvalluvar's parentage or specify his birth to a Brahmin father and a Pariah mother. However, differences were later identified in the 1835 edition of Thiruvalluvar Malai by Vishaka Perumal Iyer and the 1837 edition by his brother Saravana Perumal Iyer that suggested that both parents of Thiruvalluvar were Brahmins. Kandappan complained to Ellis that "four new verses had been added to the original version of Thiruvalluvar Malai". He also noted that Ellis' omissions about Valluvar's possible parentage as the son of a brahmin father and a pariah mother contributed to historical distortion and "co-opting Thiruvalluvar and his work into the Brahminical Hindu value system".

Thass found the discrepancy between the 1831/1834 texts and the 1835/1837 texts notable, suggesting a deliberate intervention. Thass proposed that the publication of Thirukkural by Ellis likely alerted the brahmanas to the existence of an ethical text authored by a valluvan, a sub-sect of the pariahs. This awareness may have led them to reconcile their views on the social status of valluvans and pariahs with the newfound intellectual strength and achievements demonstrated in Thirukkural. To address this, Thass suggested that a new genealogy for Thiruvalluvar emerged, attempting to align him with noble birth. Different versions of these stories circulated, with the 1847 edition by Muthuveerapillai and Vedagiri Mudaliar linking Thiruvalluvar's birth to puranic myths. Thass argued that these stories, often inconsistent and absurd, aimed to distance Thiruvalluvar from his Buddhist origins and integrate him into the Brahminical Hindu value system.

== Legacy ==
Iyothee Thass remains the first recognized anti-caste leader of the Madras Presidency. In many ways, Periyar, Dravidar Kazhagam, and B. R. Ambedkar are inheritors of his legacy. He was also the first notable Scheduled Caste leader to embrace Buddhism.

However, Iyothee Thass was largely forgotten until recent times when the Dalit Sahitya Academy, a publishing house owned by Dalit Ezhilmalai, published his writings. Ezhilmalai, then the Union Health Minister, also made a desired to name the planned National Center for Siddha Research after the leader. However, the proposal did not come into effect until 2005, when vehement protests by Se. Ku. Tamilarasan of the Republican Party of India (RPI) forced the Government to take serious note of the matter. The institute for Siddha Research (National Institute of Siddha) was subsequently inaugurated by Indian Prime Minister Manmohan Singh and Anbumani Ramadoss the then Union Health Minister on 3 September 2005 and named it after the anti-caste Buddhist leader. At its inauguration, the hospital had 120 beds. The patients were treated as per the traditional system of Siddha medicine.

A commemorative postage stamp on him was issued on 21 October 2005. His works are nationalized and solatium was given to their legal heirs in 2008.

== Criticism ==
In the early part of the 20th century, he indulged in vehement condemnation of the Swadeshi movement and the nationalist press remarking that he could "locate the power of the modern secular Brahmin in the control he wielded over public opinion."

== See also ==
- Dalit Buddhist Movement
- Dalit Ezhilmalai
