= John Rathinam =

John Rathinam was the founder of Dravida Pandian magazine together with Iyothee Thass in 1885, focusing on the sufferings of the untouchables in Madras. An "untouchable covert", throughout the 1880s he was involved in the promotion of education for "the depressed classes" within Madras. Before founding the magazine, he founded an association for the promotion of welfare among them called Dravida Kazhgam.
