= Ruth Manorama =

Indian social activist

Ruth Manorama (born 30 May 1952) is an Indian social activist from Bangalore, India who fights for Dalit women's rights, the rights of domestic workers and those in the unorganized labour sector, as well as urban slum dwellers. In 2006, she was awarded the Right Livelihood Award.

== Early life and education ==
Ruth Manorama was born on 30 May 1952 to Dorothy & Paul Dhanraj, the eldest daughter among five girls and three boys. Her parents were Dorothy Dhanraj, a teacher; and Paul Dhanraj, a postal employee. To escape the worst of caste oppression, her parents converted to Christianity. Manorama grew up seeing her parents consistently involved in social work. Her mother Dorothy fought for the right to be educated against her conservative family and eventually became a teacher and campaigned for women's education rights. Heavily influenced by Pandita Ramabai, Dorothy named her daughter Manorama after Pandita Ramabai's second daughter, who was named Mano. Her father Paul successfully mobilised economically disadvantaged people in neighbouring villages to fight for their rights to land that they'd been living on for generations. Manorama's parents strongly encouraged her and her sisters to be educated and self-reliant.

After obtaining a degree in science from the Women's Christian College, Chennai, Manorama completed a master's degree in social work from the University of Madras in 1975. In 2001, Manorama was awarded an honorary doctorate degree “for the distinguished contribution made to church and society” by the Academy of Ecumenical Indian Theology and Church Administration.

Manorama is married to N. P. Samy, a trade unionist who is the General Secretary of the National Centre for Labour. They have two daughters together.

== Career ==
Manorama has dedicated her life to battling a host of interconnected issues related to oppressions arising from caste, gender and class hierarchies. Among the issues she has fought for are the rights of domestic workers and the unorganised labour sector, slum dwellers, Dalits, and for the empowerment of marginalised women. She works at both the grassroots level as well as focuses on mass mobilisation and advocacy at the international level.

=== Positions held ===
Manorama is an integral part of many organisations working for the rights of Dalits, women, slum dwellers, and the unorganised sector. Some of these are:

- General Secretary, Women's Voice Karnataka – Founded in 1985, it works for the rights of women slum dwellers and the unorganised sector.
- President, National Alliance of Women – This was set up following the Fourth World Conference of Women in Beijing in 1995 with the aim of monitoring government performance on its responsibilities to women.
- Joint Secretary, Christian Dalit Liberation Movement – Formed in the 1980s, this movement sought to mobilise Dalit Christians for reservations in public appointments and educational institutions.
- Secretary, Karnataka State Slum Dwellers Federation – This organisation educates & mobilises slum dwellers to fight for their rights.
- Secretary, Organisation Building at the National Centre for Labour – This is the apex organisation for unorganised labour in India and is involved in the lobbying and drafting the Social Security Bill for the welfare and rights of 394 million unorganised labour in India.
- President, National Federation of Dalit Women (NFDW) – In 1993, Ruth helped organise a public hearing on Violence Against Dalit Women, which led to the creation of NFDW in 1995. It is a special platform to address the unique violence and discrimination faced by Dalit women, especially in rural areas and slums

She is also a part of several international collectives and organisations such as:

- Core Group MembPolier, Asian Women's Human Rights Council – an Asian network of women involved in human rights work.
- Member, Advisory Group Of The International Women’s Rights Action Watch (Asia Pacific) – this group supports and facilitates advocacy campaigns for women's rights
- Co-Convener, International Lobby & Advocacy for Dalit Human Rights – In 1998, on the 50th anniversary of the Universal Declaration of Human Rights, this campaign was founded to re-iterate that Dalit rights are human rights, and created a national signature campaign with 2.5 million signatures to root out casteism in India.

Within India, she is also a member of the Karnataka State Planning Board, the State Commission for Women, the Task Force on Women's Empowerment of the Government of India and a number of other state and national bodies.

=== Activism ===
In the 1980s and 1990s, Manorama led processions of over 150,000 people to protest against Operation Demolition by the State Government of Karnataka, which was a forced eviction campaign. She and other activists demanded protection for those to be evicted and the right to live legally and with dignity. On behalf of the slum dwellers, Manorama fought court cases at the High Court and the Supreme Court of India against this move by the Karnataka administration.

Manorama also established the first trade union in the country in 1987 for domestic workers in Bengaluru and strove for inclusion in the Minimum Wages.

Manorama has worked to mobilise the underprivileged from a grass-root levels since the 1980s. In more than 120 slums, she has been responsible for the mobilisation, training and empowerment of women to deal with the discrimination and violence that they face and to take leadership within their communities. Ruth is also committed to the cause of emancipation of Dalits. She has participated in several struggles against human rights violations, for land rights and for the cause of Dalit women and contributed immensely to the mainstreaming of Dalit issues.

“Dalit women in India are the Dalits among Dalits and suffer from three-fold oppression — on account of gender as a result of patriarchy, caste ‘the untouchable', and class — as they hail from the poorest and most marginalised communities. Eighty per cent of Scheduled Castes live in rural areas, are dependent on wage employment and have to contend with high rates of under employment which results in greater incidence of poverty,” said Ruth forcefully in an interview with The Hindu.

=== Politics ===
Manorama has been vocal of her opinion that women should be more involved in politics. In a panel about 'Dalit Women in Politics: Past, Present, and Future', organised by All India Dalit Mahila Adhikar Manch and The Blue Club, she talked about the shortage of dalits, particularly women, who participated in politics. She spoke about the patriarchy that is so rampant in Indian politics so most women who entered politics was through nepotism and were simply used as a false token of equality in parliament. She also said that marginalized communities, such as dalit women. were the drivers of change.

She first entered the political scene as an independent candidate in the Bharathi Nagar constituency in 2004. She gained 1.61% of the vote share.

In the 2014 Indian general election, she was named as the Janata Dal (Secular) candidate from Bangalore South (Lok Sabha constituency) which constitutes fairly upper-class and literate voters. She campaigned on her live long dream of seeing a safe, corruption-free, and inclusive society. She gained 2.30% of the vote share.

== Nominations and awards ==
In 2006, Manorama was awarded the Right Livelihood Award for "her commitment over decades to achieving equality for Dalit women, building effective and committed women’s organizations and working for their rights at national and international levels.” The Right Livelihood Award is considered the alternative Nobel Prize and the world's premier award for personal courage and social transformation.

Manorama was also one among the thousand nominees for the 1,000 Peace Women for Nobel Peace Prize in 2005.

== Further reading and external links ==
- "Right Livelihood Award Recipient Ruth Manorama". Right Livelihood Foundation. Archived from the original on 6 February 2007.
- "Ruth Manorama (2006, India)". Right Livelihood Foundation.
- "Ruth Manorama".
- Josephine Joseph (4 April 2014). "JD(S) fields Right Livelihood awardee in Bangalore South".
- Pushpa Achanta (11 April 2014). "I want to pull more women into politics: Ruth Manorama".
- Sudha Umashanker (23 July 2011). "A relentless crusader". The Hindu.
- Sunitha Rao (2 April 2014). "No money, no biryani. Only audacity of hope". The Times of India.
- National Election Watch. "Candidate Profile Ruth Manorama".
- Mansi Maheshwari (29 April 2019). "The Badass Women of Indian Politics: Election 2019".
- Meena Kandasamy (27 December 2007). "On Caste and Patriarchy: An Interview with Ruth Manorama".
- "Women in Informal Sector: 'To Keep on Keeping on'". Economic and Political Weekly. 21 (51): 2216–2218. 1986. JSTOR 4376465..
- Border Politics: Social Movements, Collective Identities, and Globalization. NYU Press. 2015. ISBN 9781479898992. JSTOR j.ctt9qff82..
- Mukul (1995). "To Organise the Unorganised". Economic and Political Weekly. 30 (24): 1422–1423. JSTOR 4402874..
- Dietrich, Gabriele (1995). "Women's Struggle for Production of Life: Public Hearings of Women Workers in Informal Sector". Economic and Political Weekly. 30 (26): 1551–1554. JSTOR 4402933..
- Nigam, Aditya (2002). "In Search of a Bourgeoisie: Dalit Politics Enters a New Phase". Economic and Political Weekly. 37 (13): 1190–1193. JSTOR 4411919..
- Narasimhan, Sakuntala (2007). "Affirmative Action: Cross-Commonalities in the Backlash". Economic and Political Weekly. 42 (16): 1414–1416. JSTOR 4419489.
