= Gogu Shyamala =

Writer

- Occupations: Writer, activist
- Known for: Dalit short stories

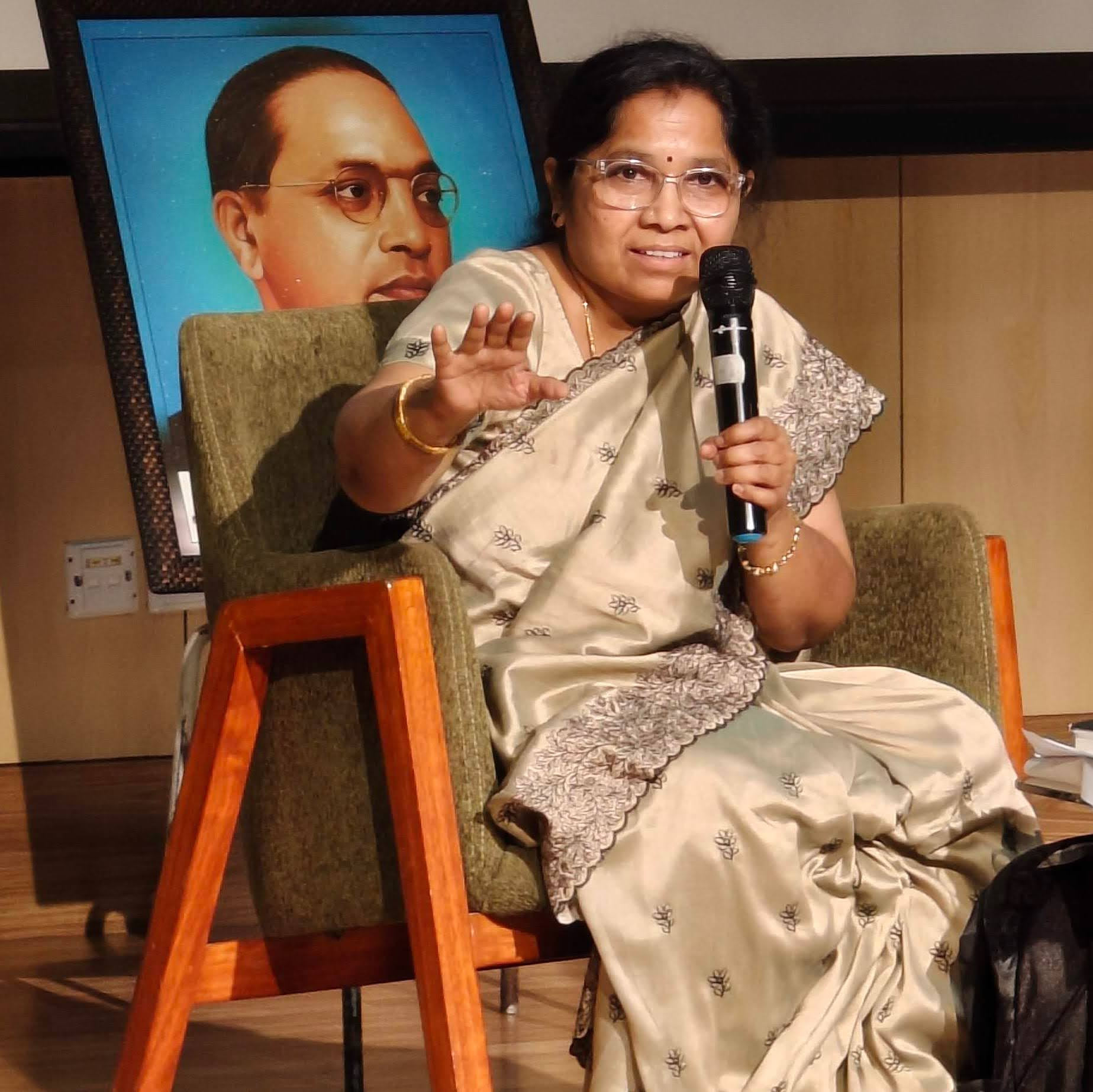
Gogu Shyamala, during Phule-Ambedkar Memorial Week, Azim Premji University, Bengaluru, India, 14 April 2026.

Gogu Shyamala is a Telugu-language writer and women's activist and a prominent Dalit.

== Biography ==
Gogu Shyamala was born in 1969 in Peddemul village in Ranga Reddy district (now part of Telangana). Her parents are agricultural workers. She was also the leader of a vetti (unpaid labour) team that worked for the local landlord. She has stated that her brother Ramachandra was forced into agricultural labour, but she was the only one of her three siblings who obtained higher education. Financial constraints initially prevented her from enrolling in college, however she eventually obtained a Bachelor of Arts from the Dr. B.R. Ambedkar Open University. Around that time, she became an activist with the Communist Party of India (Marxist–Leninist), but insists that she never let the politics overshadow the education.

== Activism ==
In an interview in 2016, Gogu Shyamala described her awakening consciousness to casteism and discrimination in India as an adult, noting "I never realized that there was any discrimination as a kid. It was after growing up that I discovered it." As a student leader, she protested living conditions and food provisions in her hostel. In college, she became an activist with the Communist Party of India (Marxist–Leninist), but since parted from them following the Tsundur massacre. It was at this point that Shyamala began to question the Left. "I slowly began to read Ambedkar and understood how deep-rooted caste was in Indian society. That's also when I understood that communism may have removed religion, but the caste divide still existed. Even today, if you see any Dalit parliamentarians, it is only because of reservation," she says. She identifies herself as a Dalit feminist.

Following the suicide of a Dalit student at the University of Hyderabad, Rohith Vemula, Gogu Shyamala made several statements in support of Vemula and his family, calling for greater participation from the English media on questions of caste and feminism.

She represented Anveshi and Dalit Women’s Forum in the World Conference against Racism held in Durban in 2001. She is a member of the Anveshi Executive Committee. Her current work at the Anveshi Centre for Women's Studies focuses on creating biographies of significant Dalit female political leaders. She is presently leading an Oxfam funded research project on domestic violence and dalit women.

== Writing ==
A review of some of her stories in translation described Gogu Shyamala's writing as having "an evidently oral quality," which created detailed and authentic portraits of the people and situations she describes. This "oral quality" has been described as "the most striking thing" about her collection of short stories, Father May Be An Elephant And Mother Only A Small Basket, But... which is a landmark in Telangana dalit literature in translation. This was part of her work on a project titled ‘Dalit Women’s Biographies,(movement perspective of Dalit feminism) This project is part of the Dalits and Minorities Initiative. Her earlier volume Nallapoddu (Black Dawn) is a collection of Telangana Madiga poetry and literature that has won critical acclaim in literary circles. Shyamala is a prolific short story writer, and regularly publishes in journals such as Bhumika, Prasthanam, Pratighatana, Mana Telangana, Praja Kala Mandali and Nigha.

== Bibliography ==
=== Fiction ===
- Father May Be An Elephant And Mother Only A Small Basket, But ... (New Delhi: Navayana, 2012)
- Tataki Wins Again & Brave Heart Badeyya (Kottayam, DC Books, 2008)

=== Non-Fiction ===
- Nene Balaanni: T.N.Sadalakshmi bathuku katha (Hyderabad: Hyderabad Book Trust, 2011)
- Vaada pillala kathalu (Hyderabad, Anveshi, 2008)
- "Gender Consciousness in Dalit Women’s Literature." Gender Pratiphalanaalu. Gender Consciousness and its Consequences (Warangal: Kakatiya University, 2005)

=== Edited volumes ===
- Co-editor, Nallaregatisallu: Maadiga, Maadiga Upakulala Adolla Kathalu (Furrows in Black Soil: Short Stories of Maadiga and Sub-castes’ Women) (Hyderabad, Sabbanda Maisawa Publications, 2006) .
