= Shailaja Paik =

Indian-American historian

- Born: 1974 (age 51–52); Pohegaon, Maharashtra, India
- Title: Charles Phelps Taft Distinguished Professor of History

Academic background
- Education: Nowrosjee Wadia College (B.A.); Savitribai Phule Pune University (M.A.); University of Warwick (Ph.D.)
- Thesis: Daughters of the lesser god: Dalit women's education in postcolonial Pune. (2007)

Academic work
- Discipline: History
- Sub-discipline: Asian history Modern Indian history
- Institutions: University of Cincinnati

Shailaja Paik (born 1974) is an Indian scholar and historian of modern Indian history who focuses on intersections of class, sexuality, and caste, with a particular emphasis on Dalit experiences and perspectives. She is currently the Charles Phelps Taft Distinguished Research Professor of History and affiliate faculty in Women's, Gender, and Sexuality Studies and Asian Studies at the University of Cincinnati. She is a 2024 MacArthur Fellow.

== Early life and education ==
Paik was born in 1974 into a Marathi-speaking Dalit family in Pohegaon, Maharashtra, India, where she was one of four daughters. The family moved to Pune, where Paik grew up in a "one-room house in a slum area" in Yerawada. Her parents, and especially her father, encouraged the girls to obtain an education.

Paik attended Nowrosjee Wadia College and Savitribai Phule Pune University (1994 BA, 1996 MA) before earning her PhD in 2007 from the University of Warwick.

== Career ==
Paik first came to the U.S. in 2005, as part of a fellowship from Emory University. She has previously worked at Union College as a visiting assistant professor of history (2008–2010) and at Yale University as a postdoctoral associate and visiting assistant professor of South Asian history (2012–2013). Paik has worked at the University of Cincinnati since 2010.

She has written two books: Dalit Women's Education in Modern India, which focuses on the "double discrimination" experienced by Dalit women throughout their pursuit of basic rights, and The Vulgarity of Caste: Dalits, Sexuality, and Humanity in Modern India, about the experiences of Dalit women in the Marathi theatre form Tamasha.

== Awards ==
Paik was awarded the 2023 John F. Richards Prize in South Asian History by the American Historical Association.

== Publications ==
=== Books ===
- Dalit Women’s Education in Modern India: Double Discrimination (2014)
- The Vulgarity of Caste: Dalits, Sexuality, and Humanity in Modern India (2022)
