= Thandavaraya Mudaliar =

Tamil scholar

Thandavarayar was a Tamil scholar and writer. He was born in Villipakkam near Chennai.

== Education and missions ==
He studied Tamil from Uzhalur Velappa Desikar, Varathappa Mudaliar, and Vaduganatha Thambiran. He has studied English, Telugu, Kannada, Hindustani, Marathi & Sanskrit. He learned Tamil grammar from Mahavithuvan Ramanuja Kavirayar and Saravana Perumalayar. He has been the leading Tamil poet of the Chennai Education Society. In 1843 he served as a judge in the Chengalpattu Court. He was the Pioneer of developing wealth of vocabulary in political matters.

== Works ==
Thandavaraya translated the Panchatanra from the Maharastrian version, instead of Sanskrit to Tamil.

- Ilakkana Vinaa Vidai
- Kathamanjari
- Tiruttaṇikaimālai
- Tiruppōrūrpatikam
- Panchatantra Kadhai (Translation)

== Published texts ==
The first three volumes of the Sathura agarathi, composed by Veeramamuni, were printed and published in 1824. In 1835, Thandavara published the book Grammar Panchakam (Epistle, Intrinsic, and Extrinsic Venpamalai).and printed the first ten parts of Soodamani Nigandu. He also printed and published the first eight parts of the Chendhar Thivakaram.

== Death ==
Thandavaraya Mudaliar died in 1850.

== Other sources ==
- Mayilai Seeni. Venkatasami (2001). Tamil literature in the nineteenth century. Meyyappaṉ tamiḻāyvakam.
- Ramasamy Pulavar, 'Tamil Puluvar series' Thandavaraya Mudaliar.
