= South Asian Americans Leading Together =

Nonprofit organization in Maryland, U.S.

- Abbreviation: SAALT
- Formation: September 2000; 26 years ago
- Type: Nonprofit
- Tax ID no.: 52-2216665
- Headquarters: Takoma Park, Maryland
- Location: United States
- Website: https://saalt.org/

South Asian Americans Leading Together (SAALT) was a South Asian American civil rights organization focused on immigrant rights and racial justice. Founded in 2000 and headquartered near Washington, DC, it became a key policy group and a hub for South Asian organizations across the United States in the years after 9/11. It announced that it would shut down in 2024.

== History ==
=== 2000–2006: Launch, and post-9/11 work ===
SAALT was founded in 2000 as a civic engagement and leadership development program. Early programs emphasized civic engagement and cross-community training.

Between 2001 and 2002, the group changed its name from the Indian American Leadership Center to South Asian Americans Leaders of Tomorrow, and took on a more explicitly focus around social and racial justice. The board formally hired co-founder Deepa Iyer as the first Executive Director, and the group's work began to shift decisively from leadership development to civil-rights monitoring, rapid response, federal advocacy, and network-building.

Much of this change in focus came in the wake of the September 11 attacks, in response to the waves of hate violence directed at Arab, Muslim, Middle Eastern, Muslim, and South Asian American communities.

By late 2002, SAALT compiled its first report, American Backlash, documenting 645 incidents of discrimination and violence in the first week after 9/11, drawing on newspapers and other primary sources. The organization convened community forums, listening sessions, and press briefings to record firsthand accounts of violence, harassment, and detention, working to uncover the scope of post-9/11 discrimination.

It would link hate-crime response to opposition to the National Security Entry-Exit Registration System (NSEERS) and related enforcement policies, and then to the broader war on terror.

In the years after 9/11, SAALT's network-building role emerged through collaborations with South Asian groups (e.g. Desis Rising Up and Moving, Adhikaar, the Sikh Coalition, SALDEF, Manavi, Maitri, Chhaya CDC), Arab and Muslim groups (e.g. the American-Arab Anti-Discrimination Committee, Muslim Advocates), Asian American groups (e.g. National Council of Asian Pacific Americans), and other civil rights groups (e.g. Detention Watch, Rights Working Group).

=== 2007–2016: Building networks ===
SAALT held its first biennial National South Asian Summit in 2007, bringing together over two hundred participants for workshops, networking, and a Congressional briefing and lobby day. The summits would take place every two years until 2017.

The group changed its name to South Asian Americans Leading Together in 2008.

In 2008, SAALT launched the National Coalition of South Asian Organizations (NCSO), over thirty local groups from across the United States into a single network, and a shared agenda. Political scientist Sangay Mishra wrote about the NCSO in Desis Divided: The Political Lives of South Asian Americans:

South Asian American organizations working in different parts of the United States found a strong ally in SAALT that could amplify their voices. On the initiative of SAALT, thirty-two South Asian organizations from twelve regions of the United States came together in New York City in June 2008 to announce the formation of the National Coalition of South Asian Organizations…The coalition was a result of attempts by many of these organizations over the last several years to develop a comprehensive coordination among South Asian organizations working in different regions of the United States.

By the late 2000s, SAALT increased its focus on generating public-facing research that partners could deploy locally. SAALT's 2014 report Under Suspicion, Under Attack was a more comprehensive account of the first decade of post-9/11 discrimination. Subsequent reports (Power, Pain, Potential in 2017, Communities on Fire in 2018) made the connection between hate and backlash precipitated by 9/11, U.S. wars in the Middle East, and the rise of Presidential candidate Donald Trump.

In 2012, SAALT coordinated a major report, In Our Own Words: Narratives of South Asian New Yorkers Affected by Racial and Religious Profiling, working with DRUM and other members of the New York City Profiling Collaborative. Through over six hundred surveys and four focus groups, the report discussed the ways that South Asian New Yorkers were often questioned about their faith or national origin by government officials, encouraged to spy on other community members, and sometimes forced to alter their behavior to avoid additional scrutiny.

In August 2012, a white supremacist opened gunfire in Oak Creek, Wisconsin, killing six Sikh community members while they worshiped at their gurdwara. SAALT staff made multiple visits to the community, working with local partners, and supporting policy strategies with allied groups.

During this period, SAALT also began to work on a wider range of issues. For example, in 2007, it commissioned a report on South Asian community organizations with a focus on local organizations fighting gender violence, and gave Congressional testimony on immigrant survivors of domestic violence.

In 2014, Suman Raghunathan became the organization's second Executive Director, replacing the outgoing Iyer.

SAALT increased engagement with Black racial justice issues in response to the Black Lives Matter movement. In 2015, SAALT issued its first statement condemning police violence, participated in a congressional briefing on racial profiling, and convened youth South Asian activists in Washington, D.C. to discuss strategies on addressing anti-Black racism in South Asian communities.

=== 2017–2024: Data, travel bans, and COVID-19 ===
SAALT increased its anti-hate advocacy in 2017, in response to the rise in hate violence and discriminatory policies targeting South Asian Americans and Muslims following the 2016 U.S. Presidential election. Under Raghunathan, this period saw SAALT release widely-cited reports detailing the intersection of demographic growth and hate incidents, organize Congressional briefings to address the uptick in violence, and actively participate in campaigns against policies like the "Muslim travel ban" and the inclusion of a citizenship question on the 2020 Census.

The group also focused on building community capacity through summits, training programs like the Young Leaders Institute, and fostering collaborations within the National Coalition of South Asian Organizations. This included, for example, creating the South Asian Rapid Response Network with Muslims for Just Futures, and co-hosting the first-ever Congressional briefing on caste with Equality Labs.

By 2019, SAALT started taking on more formal positions on South Asian foreign policy, outside of United States involvement. This often focused on opposition to Hindutva in India.

The National Coalition of South Asian Organizations continued to grow over time, reaching about sixty organizations by 2019. By 2020, SAALT staff described challenges in developing a more defined politics, given SAALT's role in connecting groups across a wider political spectrum. That fall, it worked to tighten criteria for NCSO membership, including shared positions on issues like racial justice and caste abolition, and endorsement of the NCSO's 2008 national agenda.

In 2020, right before the start of the COVID-19 pandemic, Lakshmi Sridaran—the group's former Director of National Policy and Advocacy, and an interim Executive Director after Raghunathan's departure in 2019—became SAALT's third Executive Director.

During the COVID-19 pandemic, SAALT documented the unequal impact of the crisis on South Asian American communities, launched a multilingual resource hub offering health, economic, and legal support, and advocated for inclusive relief policies, immigrant rights, and better data representation.

In October 2024, the organization announced that it would close, following staff burnout, a halt in program work, and a period of reflection. Its closing statement described the importance of anti-caste analysis, and challenges with the organization's structure. It subsequently transferred its archives to the South Asian American Digital Archive.

== Projects ==
SAALT's long term projects included:

- National South Asian Summit, organized every two years from 2007 to 2017. Summits typically drew several hundred participants, and included workshops, award ceremonies, and Congressional lobby days.
- Young Leaders Institute, an annual summer training for college-aged activists, running from 2012 to 2018
- National Coalition of South Asian Organizations, a network of local organizations that eventually included over sixty groups
- We Build Community, an annual capacity-building training for members of the National Coalition of South Asian Organizations
- Be the Change, a national day of service organized from 2000 to 2015, attempting to connect South Asian American communities through volunteerism and civic engagement
- Demographic research on South Asian Americans, based on U.S. Census and other sources, and widely cited by researchers and the media

== Positions ==
SAALT’s core political positions have included protecting civil rights and opposing hate violence, supporting inclusive immigration policies, and promoting civic participation through voting and census engagement. The organization emphasized a pan–South Asian approach, coalition building, leadership development, and policy advocacy informed by community research and education.

In 2011's Confronting Islamophobia: Civil Rights Advocacy in the United States, Erik Love cited Prema Kurien's broader description of South Asian American organizations as a helpful description of SAALT's approach. Kurien wrote:

Members of South Asian organizations characterize themselves as individuals and groups that are progressive…inclusive, and oriented toward social change, with a primary focus on domestic American issues. They argue that there are many cultural similarities between individuals of South Asian background, and that in the U.S. they also face common concerns and similar treatment as "brown skinned" individuals. In addition, they emphasize that there are growing subgroups of South Asian Americans-besides Pakistanis and Bangladeshis, such as Indian Muslims, Indian Christians, Sikhs, Bengalis, Indo-Caribbeans, and working-class Indians, all of whom feel alienated from the Hindu-centric vision of many of the Indian organizations and, therefore, favor a more inclusive South Asian American identity.

== Impact ==
Sangay Mishra wrote about SAALT in Desis Divided: The Political Lives of South Asian Americans:

National-level advocacy organizations of South Asians focused on social justice mobilization have also come of age in the last ten to fifteen years. South Asian Americans Leading Together…is one of the most important organizations of this kind…working toward building its capacity as an advocacy group that could represent the growing South Asian American population—particularly low-income and working-class segments and those impacted by racial and religious profiling—to policy makers and others…SAALT has been extremely effective in highlighting the ongoing profiling of South Asians and Muslims in the post-9/11 period and helped educate other Asian American organizations about the critical importance of this issue for the larger South Asian and Asian American communities. It has also been effective in amplifying the voices of low-income and working-class South Asians and has worked toward producing a counternarrative to the model minority discourse about the community.

SAALT's work and research was widely cited by media and advocacy groups in the United States. Academics particularly cited SAALT’s demographic research on South Asian Americans, as well as their findings on hate violence.

In 2024, the remaining SAALT staff published an assessment of the organization’s arc. It reflected on both their achievements and shortcomings. It noted that the group "filled a critical need at the national level of protecting South Asian communities in the wake of violent backlash following 9/11, using federal policy and advocacy as our primary strategies, in partnership with longstanding, local and regional South Asian organizations." In addressing their decision to shut down two decades later, they described a combination of staff and administrative issues, the challenge of addressing caste, and questions on the effectiveness of federal advocacy.

== Publications ==
SAALT has published over a hundred reports, policy briefs, factsheets, videos, and webinars, frequently cited by media and researchers. Major reports include:

- American Backlash (2001)
- From Macacas to Turban Toppers: The Rise in Xenophobic and Racist Rhetoric in American Political Discourse (2010)
- In Our Own Words, Narratives of South Asian New Yorkers Affected by Racial and Religious Profiling (2012)
- In the Face of Xenophobia: Lessons to Address Bullying of South Asian American Youth (2013)
- Under Suspicion, Under Attack: Xenophobic Political Rhetoric and Hate Violence against South Asian, Muslim, Sikh, Hindu, Middle Eastern, and Arab Communities in the United States (2014)
- Power, Pain, Potential: South Asian Americans at the Forefront of Growth and Hate in the 2016 Election Cycle (2017)
- Communities on Fire: Confronting Hate Violence and Xenophobic Political Rhetoric (2018)
- Unequal Consequences: The Disparate Impact of Covid-19 Across South Asian Communities (2020)
