= Dalit Mahila Samiti =

Women's organisation in India

Dalit Mahila Samiti (DMS, and also known as Dalit Women's Association) is an organization for Dalit women in Uttar Pradesh. The group provides leadership opportunities and ways for women to communicate their issues with one another.

== About ==
The Dalit Mahila Samiti (DMS) was formally organized in 2002 or 2004 and is supported by Vanagana, a feminist non-governmental organization. However, it was first organized as early as 1992 in order to mobilize Dalit women. It is based in the state of Uttar Pradesh (UP). The group has seven different clusters in two sub-regions of the Chitrakoot District. Men may join the women's group as sahayogi, or supporters, and there is a yearly membership fee for women. Members of the group receive a badge and information about Dalit leaders.

DMS began to create dialogues among women in various communities in UP which lead to some women taking on leadership positions. Each village selects two women to represent the local DMS chapter at the cluster level. Clusters are organized to have presidents, treasurers and secretaries who meet once a month.
