= National Centre for Labour =

Trade union in India

The National Centre for Labour or NCL formally came into being in May 1995 in Bangalore, Karnataka State, India.

The creation of NCL as a national confederation of Labour organisations in the unorganised / Informal sector of India was the outcome of a study of informal sector organisations that concluded that the absence of a collective voice for the informal sector workers / labour at the national level resulted in their concerns not being effectively addressed at the national level. NCL was constituted by its founding organisations namely National Federation of Construction Labour (NFCL), Self Employed Women’s Association (SEWA), National Fish Workers Forum (NFF), Sarva Shramik Sangh, Van Mazdoor Mandal, Kamani Employees Union and other independent trade unions.

NCL is run by an Executive Committee. N. P. Samy is its General Secretary in 2020.
