= Oru Paisa Tamilan =

Oru Paisa Tamilan was a Tamil language weekly magazine, which was published and edited by Iyothee Thass, a Dalit activist. It started its publication on 9 June 1907 in Royapettah. It was later renamed simply as Tamilan (Thamizhan). It ceased publication in 1934.

== Publications ==
Thass revived Tamil Buddhism through his writing. He and others wrote several articles critical of Hinduism and Brahminism. The magazine had the dialogues of Tamil Nationalism and laid the foundation for the Dravidian politics.
