= Suraj Pal Chauhan =

Indian writer and publisher (1955–2021)

Suraj Pal Chauhan was a Dalit writer and publisher. He was born on 20 April, 1955 in a Balmik family of village Bhusawali of Aligarh district, Uttar Pradesh, India. His book, Harry Kab Ayega (Short Stories) 1999 is a well-known work in Dalit literature. He was a recipient of the Hindi Academy Award.

Death

He died on 15 June 2021.
