= Equality Labs =

South Asian research and activist organisation

Equality Labs is a South-Asian Ambedkarite organisation co-founded by Thenmozhi Soundararajan, Aruna Sanghapali and Valli Karunakaran in 2015. The organisation focuses on addressing caste discrimination within the South Asian diaspora and has conducted significant research on the issue. They released a groundbreaking report in 2016, presenting the first-ever survey on caste and caste discrimination in the US. Equality Labs has actively advocated for marginalized communities, shedding light on pervasive caste discrimination experienced by Dalits and other marginalized groups, including on college campuses. Additionally, they have conducted research on hate speech and disinformation on platforms like Facebook India, calling for stronger content moderation policies to address targeted hate speech against marginalized communities.

== Background ==
In 2016, Equality Labs conducted the first survey on caste discrimination in the United States, exposing the extent to which the South Asian diaspora in America is affected by this issue. According to the report, a considerable number of Dalits (those who are deemed "untouchable" in the caste system) face prejudice and violence as a result of their caste, both at employment and in K-12 school. In partnership with Congresswoman Pramila Jayapal's office, Equality Labs and its partners arranged the first congressional briefing on caste discrimination in 2019. The purpose of the briefing was to educate politicians about the incidence and impact of caste discrimination in the United States, as well as to push for policies and legislation that address this issue. During the briefing, the panelists shed light on the ubiquitous nature of caste prejudice and the need for a better understanding of how caste functions among the South Asian diaspora in the United States throughout the briefing. Equality Labs has performed hate speech and misinformation research on Facebook India, discovering that Islamophobic content was the most prominent type of hate speech, followed by casteist hate speech, fake news, and gender/sexuality-related hate speech.

In addition, Equality Labs has highlighted the prevalence of disinformation in Asian American and Pacific-Islander communities. A report it published in 2022 discusses how false information is used to pit underprivileged groups against one another, perpetuate tensions within communities, and contribute to the maintenance of white supremacy. The report cites examples of disinformation, such as the Men's Rights Asians movement and Hindu nationalism in India.

In 2023, Equality Labs was part of a coalition introduced by Kshama Sawant testifying in support of an ordinance in Seattle to ban caste-based discrimination and add caste as a protected category to the Seattle Equal Rights law. A similar bill introduced by Aisha Wahab based on the report by Equality Labs has passed the Senate Judiciary Committee to add caste as a protected category in the Unruh Civil Rights Act.
