= Asha Kowtal =

Indian women's rights activist

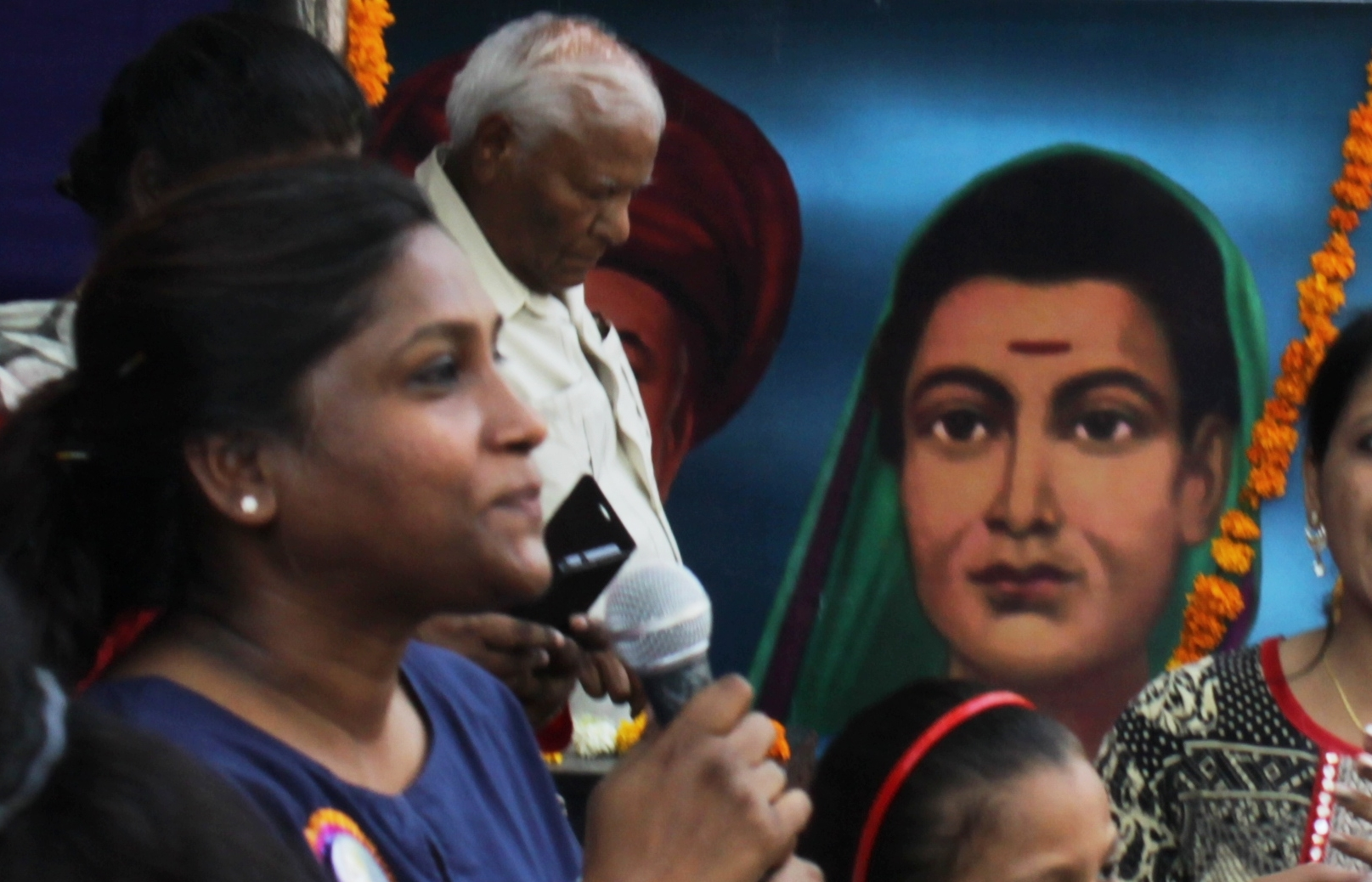
- Known for: Activist for Dalit women's rights

Asha Kowtal is an activist and expert in the field of Dalit women’s rights. She is the Former General Secretary of the Dalit Women’s Rights movement in India, called the All India Dalit Mahila Adhikar Manch (AIDMAM), which is part of the National Campaign on Dalit Human Rights. She is also a convenor and part of the steering committee of WinG-India, a network advancing leadership of women from the north-eastern part of India, and involving Dalit and tribal communities in governance at all levels with the aim of challenging exploitative structures and enabling a society with gender equality.

== Professional qualifications ==
Kowtal holds a master's degree in social work and has held various positions with donor agencies, working in the development sector with a focus on the rights of India’s marginalised women.

== Professional career ==
Under Kowtal's leadership, AIDMAM has organised multiple activities, including a National Tribunal on Justice for Dalit Women, which came out with a report on violence against Dalit women after sittings held on 30 September and 1 October 2013.

Kowtal and AIDMAM have also organised a national conference to discuss the specific needs of Dalit women, titled "Reframing Budgets for Dalit Women in India", training programs on International Human Rights Mechanisms and Dalit women self-respect marches across key Indian states, such as the Dalit Mahila Swabhiman Yatra. She has also organised North American tour as Dalit Women Self Respect March, around 16 cities of North America in 2015.

Asha has been involved in creation of Dalit History Month. Its goal is to share the contributions to history from Dalits around the world.

Kowtal was also a speaker at the UN Women and European Union 'National Conference on Gender Equality & Women’s Empowerment' in New Delhi. She also spoke at the April 2014 Women in the World Summit in New York on the mass mobilisation of Dalit women through self-respect marches. She has been a regular speaker at various United Nations events.
