= All India Dalit Mahila Adhikar Manch =

All India Dalit Mahila Adhikar Manch (AIDMAM) is a platform for women from the Dalit community to raise their voices for justice. This platform has raised several struggles and movements for self-respect and dignity. AIDMAM is a movement which was initiated by the National Campaign on Dalit Human Rights (NCDHR). The aim of the movement is to recognize how the class, caste, and gender identity of a dalit woman overlap and place them at the very bottom of the social hierarchy. They work to empower dalit women to challenge these caste, class, and gender hierarchies and move forward in their struggle for justice. They do so through networking, enhancing skills and leadership at the state and district level.

== Beginnings and organisation ==
AIDMAM was founded in 2006 by convener, Vimal Thorat and general secretary, Asha Kowtal. They primarily work in North India and have intervened in six states: Haryana, Orissa, Punjab, Bihar, MP and Rajasthan. As a movement they are constantly networking with dalit, women and human rights organisations and facilitate the building of dalit women's perspective. They monitor violence against dalit women and also conduct research on these issues which facilitated their advocacy efforts. Building on the capacities of dalit women connected with the movement is one of their main activities.

In 2009, AIDMAM started a programme which worked with dalit women who were elected representatives of panchayats in five states. The aim was to train these women to act upon issues of violence against women. They also started a dalit women's self-respect yatra, which was a monthlong yatra in 2014 where they traveled across states and organised the dalit community and campaigned against violence against dalit women. In 2015, AIDMAM traveled in the United States and spoke to black activists in that country. AIDMAM held additional marches in 2018. Also in 2018, they presented a "side event" at the 38th session of the United Nations Human Rights Council which included testimonies of caste-based violence against women. A social media campaign, called #DalitWomenFight, is used by AIDMAM to increase support for their work.

In 2020, there was a transition period at the National Secretariat- All India Dalit Mahila Adhikar Manch- NCDHR. Under the leadership of Vimat Thorat, the position of general secretary was provided to Abirami Jotheeswaran. She was working as a National Program Coordinator in the National Dalit Movement for Justice-NCDHR. At NDMJ, she was part of the team that incessantly worked to bring the amendment to the SC&ST Prevention of Atrocities Act. Since she became the general secretary, the operational states changed to Bihar, Delhi, Haryana, Madhya Pradesh, Odisha, and Uttar Pradesh. Currently, the themes that AIDMAM works on are:

•Promotion of leadership among Dalit women and minor girls •Addressing and preventing violence against Dalit women and minor girls •Extension of state entitlements to Dalit women

== See also ==
- Dalit Mahila Samiti
