= Sanghapali Aruna =

Indian activist

Aruna Sanghapali
- Born: 19 October 1979 (age 46); Vishakhapatnam, Andhra Pradesh, India
- Occupation: Social activist
- Known for: Dalit women's rights

Sanghapali Aruna, also known as Sanghapali Aruna Lohitakshi, is a human rights activist from India, best known for her work on Dalit women's rights. She is the Executive Director of Project Mukti.

== Life ==
Aruna was born on 19 October 1979 in Vishakapatnam, Andhra Pradesh, India, in a Dalit community. She studied for a doctorate degree in linguistics at Jawaharlal Nehru University in New Delhi, where she was a founder member of the Birsa Ambedkar Phule Students’ Association.

In 2014, Aruna was part of the Dalit Mahila Swabhiman Yatra (Dalit Women's Self-Respect Tour) travelling through India to raise awareness of caste-based violence, and was part of the Dalit Women Fight campaign in 2015. She was also involved in activism surrounding Dalit student Rohith Vemula’s death at the University of Hyderabad. She was also organiser of Dalit History Month.

As of 2018, Aruna is the Executive Director of Project Mukti, which describes itself as "a Dalit Bahujan Adivasi women, gender non-conforming, and trans led start-up working to end caste apartheid in South Asia through a promise to openness and participatory innovation." According to the Indian Express, Aruna works on digital literacy among Dalit, Bahujan, Adivasi, and Muslim communities.

Describing her work, Aruna writes:

Dalit women have all the tools to succeed once we are removed from the shadow of violence and untouchability. That is why our mission has always been to move past the narrative of atrocity and poverty and instead build technological equity and literacy among Dalit Bahujan women and gender minorities. We do this through training, building tech, growing Dalit Bahujan knowledge and culture, and fostering solidarity among Dalit Bahujan-Adivasi people.

In 2018, Aruna was the subject of controversy when she gave Jack Dorsey, CEO of Twitter, two posters, which said "End Caste Apartheid" and "Smash Brahminical Patriarchy" during a meeting in New Delhi. Dorsey posed for a group photo holding the poster saying "Smash Brahminical Patriarchy". He was subsequently criticised for holding the poster, and Twitter India apologised on his behalf.
