= Phule =

Phule may refer to:

- Jyotirao Phule, a social reformer from India
- Savitribai Phule, wife of Jyotirao Phule and a social reformer in her own right
- Phule (film), a 2025 Indian film based on the lives of Jyotirao and Savitribai
- Phule (character), a character created by Robert Asprin
