= Nilesh Jalamkar =

Indian actor, director, and producer (born 1977)

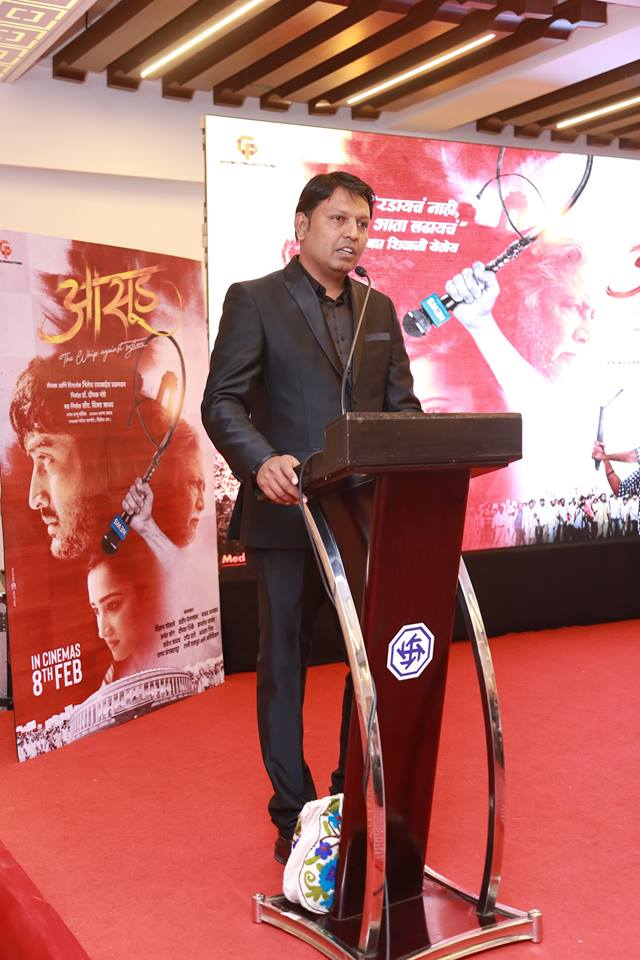
- Jalamkar in January 2019
- Born: 6 July 1977 (age 48); Mumbai, Maharashra, India
- Occupations: Film producer, film director, actor, teacher, lyricist
- Spouse: Sheetal Nilesh Jalamkar

Nilesh Jalamkar (born 6 July 1977) is an Indian actor, film director and producer of Marathi films. He has worked in Indian cinema and sometimes acted in well-known movies such as Aasud.

He began his directorial career with Debu in 2010, and has since delivered many box office hits. Jalamkar's films are known for their technical nuances and fantasy concepts and he is one of the few Indian filmmakers who have made successful films in the fantasy genre.

== Career ==
Jalamkar started his career in Marathi movies with Debu a biopic on the life of Gadge Maharaj and Mahanayak Vasant Tu a biopic on the life of Vasantrao Naik. He has worked with Anu Malik and Sonu Nigam as a director and a lyricist. His most notable work is the Multi-starrer Nagpur Adhiveshan with Makarand Anaspure, Mohan Joshi and Chetan Dalvi. His recent film, Aasud, was released on 8 February 2019.Jalamkar's 2024 film Satyashodhak is a biographical drama about lives and accomplishments of social reformers Jyotirao Phule and Savitribai Phule. his film Satyashodhak was funded by the Government of Maharashtra

Directorial credits

Year	Title
2010	Debu
2015	Mahanayak Vasant Tu
2016	Nagpur Adhiveshan
2019	Aasud
2019	Satyashodhak

== Filmography ==
Year	Film	Role	Language	Notes	References
2024	Satyashodhak	Dr. Babasaheb Ambedkar	Marathi		
