= Hari Raoji Chiplunkar =

Rao Bahadur Hari Raoji Chiplunkar
- Born: 1842; Poona, Bombay Presidency, British India
- Died: 1896 (aged 53–54); Poona, British India
- Occupations: Social reformer; philanthropist; activist
- Known for: Supporting Jyotirao Phule and Savitribai Phule, promoting education for girls and lower castes and administrative reforms

Rao Bahadur Hari Raoji Chiplunkar (1841–1896), Honorary Magistrate and President of the Landlord's Association in Poona, was a reformer, activist, and philanthropist, and close friend of intellectual and reformer, and founder of Satyashodhak Samaj, Jyotirao Phule. A prominent figure in the social and intellectual circles of the Bombay Presidency, primarily Poona, Chiplunkar donated his land and funds, enabling Savitri and Jyotirao Phule to start the first girls schools in India in 1851 on Chiplunkar's estate, including donating a building for the primary education of lower caste children in 1864, currently operating as the Bholagir School, Municipal School No. 4.

On 19 March 1883, Chiplunkar was appointed as a member of the Poona Municipal Corporation where he effected administrative reform currently practiced, an honor given to twelve distinguished citizens including Gopal Krishna Gokhale, Jyotirao Phule, Dr. R. P. Paranjpye (KCIE), Hari Narayan Apte, Dr. Vishram Ramji Ghole, and Sir M Visvesvaraya.

Chiplunkar was a founding member of the Deccan Education Society, Poona, and Fergusson College, and remained an active member of the Satyashodhak Samaj from 1858 to 1883.

Known for his charismatic personality and affable nature, Hari Raoji Chiplunkar struck a friendship with the Duke of Connaught for whom he hosted a reception and banquet in 1888. Chiplunkar built the Connaught House in what is known today as Sadhu Vaswani Chowk, where the Duke and Duchess of Connaught were given a red carpet reception. It was at this banquet, on 2 March 1888 where among the royal guests, dignitaries, industrialists and preeminent families from Bombay and Poona, Mahatma Phule chose to appear as a poor farmer wearing only a short dhoti, an old shirt, and worn out shoes. He proceeded to make a stirring speech on the destitution of the untouchables and lower classes, encouraged the Duke to visit the villages of India and witness the conditions shared by nearly nineteen crore Indians living in abject poverty. He also asked the Duke convey to Queen Victoria his message about emancipating the masses through education.

Social reformer Savitribai Phule was present at Hari Raoji Chiplunkar's funeral in 1896. In 1991, the City of Pune named the Hari Raoji Chowk commemorating Chiplunkar in Somwar Peth.
