= Satyashodhak =

2024 Indian biographical film

- Theatrical release poster
- Directed by: Nilesh Jalamkar
- Written by: Nilesh Jalamkar
- Produced by: Pravin Tayade; Appa Borate Bhimarao; Pattebahadur; Sunil Shelke; Vishal Wahurwagh
- Starring: Sandeep Kulkarni; Rajshri Deshpande
- Cinematography: Arun Prasad
- Edited by: Vijay Khochikar
- Music by: Amitraj
- Production companies: Samata Films; Abhita Films Production
- Distributed by: Reliance Entertainment
- Release date: 5 January 2024
- Running time: 145 minutes
- Country: India
- Language: Marathi

Satyashodhak is a 2024 Indian Marathi-language film about the life of Jyotirao Phule, directed by Nilesh Jalamkar, with Sandeep Kulkarni and Rajshri Deshpande in the lead roles. It was released in theatres on 5 January 2024.

== Synopsis ==
The film, set in the 19th century, against the backdrop of the British presence in India as well as social issues of casteism and poverty, focuses on the struggles faced by social activists and reformers Jyotirao Phule and Savitribai Phule. The narrative delves into the hardships faced by women, including the prohibition of remarriage for widows and the ritualistic tonsuring of their heads.

== Cast ==
- Sandeep Kulkarni as Jyotirao Phule
- Rajshri Deshpande as Savitribai Phule

== Production ==
Filming

Principal photography began on 3 June 2016, with fifty percent of filming being completed by May 2019. The shoot wrapped up on 6 July 2021.

== Reception ==
Reshma Raikwar from Loksatta wrote, "In the end, a good attempt has been made in the movie 'Satyashodak' to show how every good thought and movement takes root in the society and continues to move forward while keeping Jotib's valid idea that people die, thoughts don't die". Ayub George from The Times of India stated, "Satyashodhak is an ideal historical biopic that takes you on a tour through time and showcases the greatness of a righteous man who was instrumental in changing our society". Devendra Jadhav from Sakal opined, "Two and a half hours Jyoti – Savitri's life journey inspires us, awakens us and compels us to look beyond ourselves!!"
