= Shetkaryacha Asud =

Book authored by Mahatma Jyotiba Phule

- Author: Jyotirao Phule
- Original title: Marathi
- Language: Marathi
- Subject: Farmer's dire situation in Bombay presidency
- Genre: Non-fiction
- Publication date: 1881
- Publication place: India
- Media type: Book

Shetkaryacha Asud (transl. The Cultivator's Whipcord ) is a book written by Jyotirao Phule in 1881, originally in Marathi, describing the plight and poverty of Indian cultivators under exploitative social and economic conditions. Mahatma Phule fearlessly advocated for impoverished peasants during a time of severe oppression by landlords and the administration. In this book, he boldly challenged the elite and the colonial authorities for their role in the exploitation of farmers.

The book gives a few of the numerous reasons connected with the religion and politics that had put the Shudra farmers in such a pitiable condition. It argues that a tyrannical religion, the dominance of Brahmin employees in government departments and the luxury-loving indolence of British administrators meant that the Shudra farmers were tormented and deceived. It forms an important work of analysis for subaltern scholars.

== Content ==
The first chapter of Shetkaryacha Asud offers a scathing portrayal of the numerous festivals and life-cycle rituals observed by a 'good Hindu,' each of which, according to Phule, Brahmins exploited to claim gifts and food—"another Brahman feast of ghee and goodies." For Phule, Hinduism was not a true religion, and he described it with terms like "self-interested" (matlabi), "artificial" (krutrim), and "counterfeit" (banavati). In Phule's view, finding a true religion was central to liberating the masses from the Brahmanic yoke.

== Legacy ==
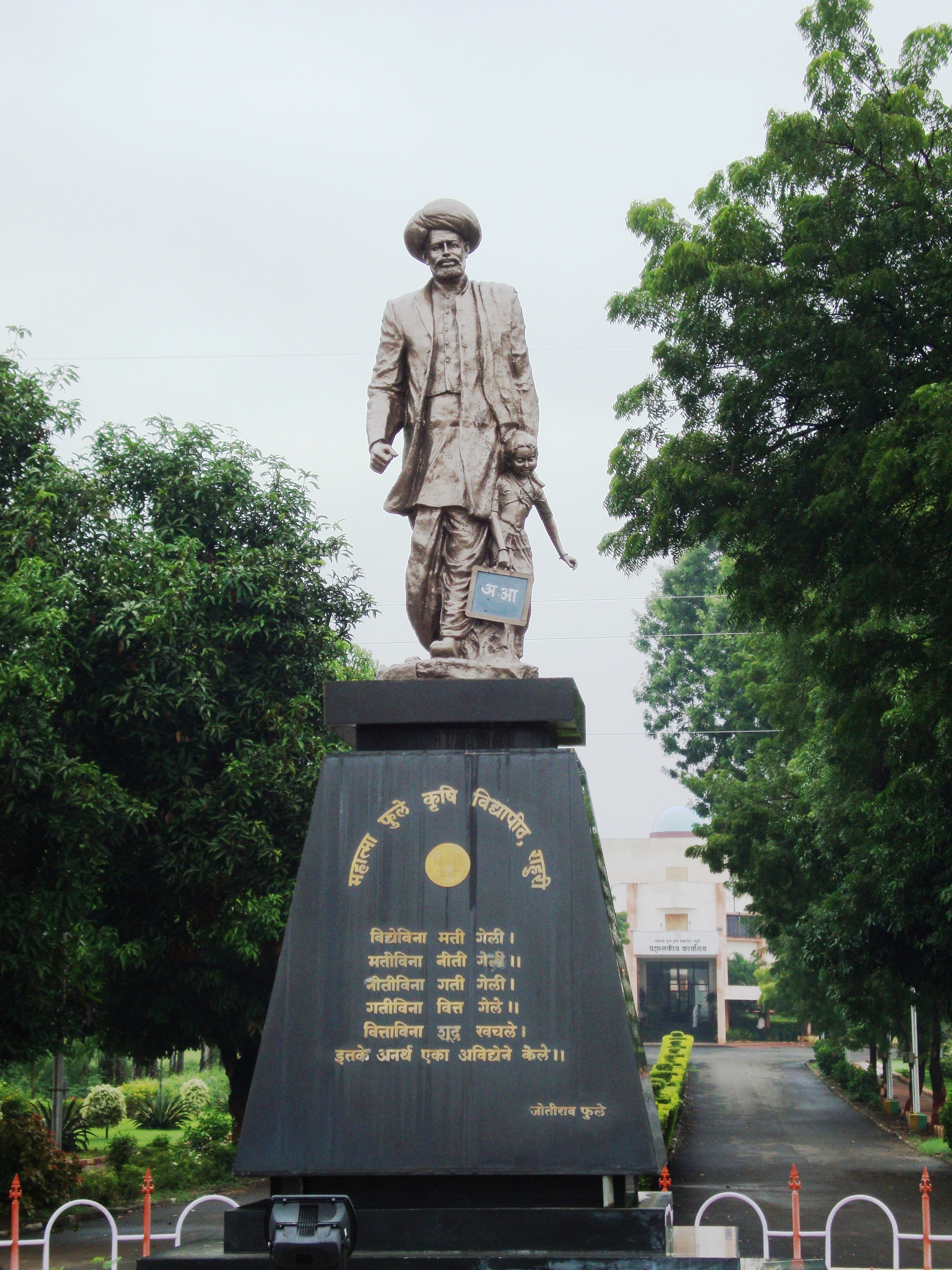
Jyotiba Phule statue in front of MPKV Rahuri with inscription text taken from Shetkaryacha Asud

In October 2024, An 18-foot bronze statue of social reformers Mahatma Jyotiba Phule and Savitribai Phule was inaugurated in Nasik by then Chief Minister Eknath Shinde and other leaders. The memorial includes an inscription from Phule's Shetkaryacha Asud book;

“Vidyevina mati geli. Mati vina niti geli. Niti vina gati geli. Gati vina vitta gele. Vittavina shudra khachle. Evdhe anartha eka avidyeni kele.”

which means;

“Without knowledge, wisdom was lost, without wisdom righteousness was lost. Without righteousness, progress was lost. Without progress, wealth was lost. Without wealth, the Shudra suffered. So much disaster was caused by the lack of knowledge.”
