= Varna (Hinduism) =

Social classes in Brahminical books

Varna (Sanskrit: वर्ण, romanized: varṇa, Hindi pronunciation: ['ʋəɾɳə]) refers to a fourfold social classification described in Brahmanical texts. The four varnas described are Brahmins, Kshatriyas, Vaishyas, and Shudras. Classical texts such as Manusmriti, describe these varnas as part of a theoretical hierarchical classification, and prescribe their occupations, requirements and duties, or dharma.

This quadruple division is a form of social stratification, quite different from the more nuanced system of Jātis, which correspond to the term "caste".

The varna system is discussed in Hindu texts, and understood as idealised human callings. The concept is generally traced back to the Purusha Sukta hymn of the Rigveda. In the post-Vedic period, the varna division is described in the Mahabharata, Puranas and in the Dharmashastra literatures.

The commentary on the Varna system in the Manusmriti is often cited. Counter to these textual classifications, many Hindu texts and doctrines question and disagree with the Varna system of social classification.

In India, communities that belong to one of the four varnas or classes are called savarna Hindus. The Dalits and tribals who do not belong to any varna were called avarna.

== Etymology and origins ==
The term varna appears in the Rigveda, where it means "colour, outward appearance, exterior, form, figure or shape". The term means "color, tint, dye or pigment" in the Mahabharata. Varna contextually means "colour, race, tribe, species, kind, sort, nature, character, quality, property" of an object or people in some Vedic and medieval texts. Varna refers to four social classes in the Manusmriti.

== Varna and jāti ==
The terms varna (theoretical classification based on occupation) and jāti (caste) are two distinct concepts. Varna refers to the fourfold social classification found in Brahmanical literature. These four varnas are described as:

- Brahmins: Vedic scholars, priests or teachers.
- Kshatriyas: Rulers, administrators or warriors.
- Vaishyas: Agriculturalists, farmers or merchants.
- Shudras: Artisans, labourers or servants.

Scholars describe this classification as theoretical or idealized, in contrast to jāti (community), which refers to the thousands of endogamous groups prevalent across the South Asia. A jati may be divided into exogamous groups based on the same gotras. The classical authors scarcely speak of anything other than the varnas; even Indologists have sometimes confused the two.

== The Vedas ==
The earliest application to the formal division into four social classes (without using the term varna) appears in the late Rigvedic Purusha Sukta (RV 10.90.11–12), where the Brahman, Rajanya (instead of Kshatriya), Vaishya and Shudra classes are described as forming the mouth, arms, thighs and feet at the sacrifice of the primordial Purusha, respectively:

11. When they divided Purusa how many portions did they make?
What do they call his mouth, his arms? What do they call his thighs and feet?
12. The Brahman was his mouth, of both his arms was the Rajanya made.
His thighs became the Vaishya, from his feet the Shudra was produced.

=== Scholarly interpretation ===
Some modern indologists believe the Purusha Sukta to be a later addition, possibly as a charter myth. Stephanie Jamison and Joel Brereton, a professor of Sanskrit and Religious Studies, state, "there is no evidence in the Rigveda for an elaborate, much-subdivided and overarching caste system", and "the varna system seems to be embryonic in the Rigveda and, both then and later, a social ideal rather than a social reality".

Ram Sharan Sharma, in his book Śūdras in Ancient India (1990), states :

"the Rig Vedic society was neither organized on the basis of social division of labour nor on that of differences in wealth ... [it] was primarily organised on the basis of kin, tribe and lineage."

== The Upanishads ==
The Chandogya Upanishad indicates that a person's varna is determined on the basis of their actions in their previous life.

Among them, those who did good work in this world [in their past life] attain a good birth accordingly. They are born as a brāhmin, a kṣatriya, or a vaiśya. But those who did bad work in this world [in their past life] attain a bad birth accordingly, being born as a dog, a pig, or as a casteless person.

— Chandogya Upanishad

The Vajrasuchi Upanishad, however, states that the status of brahman is not based on birth, knowledge, or karma, but on the direct realisation of one's own Atman (inner self, soul).

"Who indeed then is a Brahmana? He who has directly realized his Atman is without a second, devoid of class and actions[…] that exists penetrating all things that pervade everything. [He who] is devoid of the faults of thirst after worldly objects and passions… Whose mind is untouched by [pride and egoism], he only is the Brahmana. Such is the opinion of the Vedas, the smritis, the Itihasa and the Puranas. Otherwise one cannot obtain the status of a Brahmana."

— Vajrasuchi Upanishad

== The Epics ==
=== Mahabharata ===
The Mahabharata, estimated to have been completed by about the 4th century CE, discusses the Varna system in section 12.181.

The Epic offers two models on Varna. The first model describes Varna as colour-coded system, through a sage named Bhrigu, "Brahmins Varna was white, Kshatriyas was red, Vaishyas was yellow, and the Shudras' black". This description is questioned by another prominent sage Bharadwaja who says that colours are seen among all the Varnas, that desire, anger, fear, greed, grief, anxiety, hunger and toil prevails over all human beings, that bile and blood flow from all human bodies, so what distinguishes the Varnas, he asks? The Mahabharata then declares, according to Alf Hiltebeitel, a professor of religion, "There is no distinction of Varnas. This whole universe is Brahman. It was created formerly by Brahma, came to be classified by acts."

The Mahabharata thereafter recites a behavioural model for Varna, that those who were inclined to anger, pleasures and boldness attained the Kshatriya Varna; those who were inclined to cattle rearing and living off the plough attained the Vaishyas; those who were fond of violence, covetousness and impurity attained the Shudras. The Brahmin class is modelled in the epic, as the archetype default state of man dedicated to truth, austerity and pure conduct. In the Mahabharata and pre-medieval era Hindu texts, according to Hiltebeitel, Varna is not genealogical. The four Varnas are not lineages, but categories.

Narrative examples within the epic, such as Vidura holding the position of chief minister in the kingdom of Hastinapura, despite being born to a Brahmin father and a Shudra woman, illustrate that actual societal structures permitted functional flexibility regarding varna hierarchies

==== Bhagavad Gita ====
The Bhagavad Gita describes the professions, duties and qualities of members of different varnas.

There is no entity on earth, or again in heaven among the Devas, that is devoid of these three Gunas, born of Prakriti.

Of Brâhmanas and Kshatriyas and Vaishyas, as also of Sudras, O scorcher of foes, the duties are distributed according to the Gunas born of their own nature.

The control of the mind and the senses, austerity, purity, forbearance, and also uprightness, knowledge, realisation, belief in a hereafter– these are the duties of the Brâhmanas, born of (their own) nature.

Prowess, boldness, fortitude, dexterity, and also not flying from battle, generosity and sovereignty are the duties of the Kshatriyas, born of (their own) nature.

Agriculture, cattle-rearing and trade are the duties of the Vaishyas, born of (their own) nature; and action consisting of service is the duty of the Sudras, born of (their own) nature.

— Bhagavad Gita, chapter 18

=== Puranas ===
The Brahma Purana states that acting against both varna and ashrama (stage), which together guide one's dharma, leads to hell. The Brahmanda Purana calls associations between low and high varnas signs of the Kali Yuga, the age of immorality and decline.

== The Dharmasastras ==
The varna system is extensively discussed in the Dharma-shastras. The Varna system in Dharma-shastras divides society into four varnas (Brahmins, Kshatriyas, Vaishya and Shudras). Those who fall out of this system because of their grievous sins are ostracised as outcastes (untouchables) and considered outside the varna system. Barbarians and those who are unrighteous or unethical are also considered outcastes.

Recent scholarship suggests that the discussion of varna as well as untouchable outcastes in these texts does not resemble the modern era caste system in India. Patrick Olivelle, a professor of Sanskrit and Indian Religions and credited with modern translations of Vedic literature, Dharma-sutras and Dharma-shastras, states that ancient and medieval Indian texts do not support the ritual pollution, purity-impurity as the basis for varna system. According to Olivelle, purity-impurity is discussed in the Dharma-shastra texts, but only in the context of the individual's moral, ritual and biological pollution (eating certain kinds of food such as meat, urination and defecation). In his review of Dharma-shastras, Olivelle writes, "we see no instance when a term of pure/impure is used with reference to a group of individuals or a varna or caste". The only mention of impurity in the Shastra texts from the 1st millennium is about people who commit grievous sins and thereby fall out of their varna. These, writes Olivelle, are called "fallen people" and impure, declaring that they be ostracised. Olivelle adds that the overwhelming focus in matters relating to purity/impurity in the Dharma-sastra texts concerns "individuals irrespective of their varna affiliation" and all four varnas could attain purity or impurity by the content of their character, ethical intent, actions, innocence or ignorance, stipulations, and ritualistic behaviours.

Olivelle states:

Dumont is correct in his assessment that the ideology of varna is not based on purity. If it were we should expect to find at least some comment on the relative purity and impurity of the different vamas. What is even more important is that the ideology of purity and impurity that emerges from the Dharma literature is concerned with the individual and not with groups, with purification and not with purity, and lends little support to a theory which makes relative purity the foundation of social stratification.

The first three varnas are described in the Dharmashastras as "twice born" and they are allowed to study the Vedas. Such a restriction of who can study Vedas is not found in the Vedic era literature.

Manusmriti assigns cattle rearing as Vaishya occupation but historical evidence shows that Brahmins, Kshatriyas and Shudras also owned and reared cattle and that cattle-wealth was mainstay of their households. Ramnarayan Rawat, a professor of History and specialising in social exclusion in the Indian subcontinent, states that 19th century British records show that Chamars, listed as untouchables, also owned land and cattle and were active agriculturalists. The emperors of Kosala and the prince of Kasi are other examples.

Tim Ingold, an anthropologist, writes that the Manusmriti is a highly schematic commentary on the varna system, but it too provides "models rather than descriptions". Susan Bayly states that Manusmriti and other scriptures helped elevate Brahmin in the social hierarchy and these were a factor in the making of the varna system, but the ancient texts did not in some way "create the phenomenon of caste" in India.

== Buddhist texts ==
Ancient Buddhist texts mention Varna system in South Asia, but the details suggest that it was non-rigid, flexible, non-hierarchal, and with characteristics devoid of features of a social stratification system.

While the Hindu texts claimed that Brahmins were supreme in the Varna hierarchical order, Buddhist texts denied this, asserting that the Kshatriyas hold the highest status. During the Buddha period, some Kshatriyas elevated themselves as the first Varna. Buddhist literature includes stories reflecting this belief, King Arindama called a priest's son a man of low birth (hīnajacca), and the King of Kosala used a screen while speaking to his Brahmin employee to avoid seeing their face. Similarly, the Sakyas laughed at a Brahmin who entered their Mote Hall, pushed him back with a finger, and did not offer him a seat.

Digha Nikaya provides a discussion between Gotama Buddha and a Hindu Brahmin named Sonadanda who was very learned in the Vedas. Gotama Buddha asks, "By how many qualities do Brahmins recognize another Brahmin? How would one declare truthfully and without falling into falsehood, "I am a Brahmin?" Sonadanda initially lists five qualities as, "he is of pure descent on both the mother's and the father's side, he is well versed in mantras, he is of fair color handsome and pleasing, he is virtuous learned and wise, and he is the first or second to hold the sacrificial ladle". Buddha then asks the Brahmin, "If we omit one of these qualities you just listed, could not one be still a true Brahmin?" Sonadanda, one by one, eliminates fair colour and looks, then eliminates Varna in which one was born, and then eliminates the ability to recite mantra and do sacrifices as a requirement of being a Brahmin. Sonadanda asserts that just two qualities are necessary to truthfully and without falling into falsehood identify a Brahmin; these two qualities are "being virtuous and being learned and wise". Sonadanda adds that it is impossible to reduce the requirement for being a Brahmin any further, because "for wisdom is purified by morality, and morality is clarified by wisdom; where one is, the other is, the moral man has wisdom and the wise man has morality, and the combination of morality and wisdom is called the highest thing in the world". Brian Black and Dean Patton state Sonadanda admits after this, "we [Brahmins] only know this much Gotama; it would be well if Reverend Gotama would explain meaning of the two [morality, wisdom]".

Peter Masefield, a Buddhism scholar and ancient Pali texts translator, states that during the Nikāya texts period of Buddhism (3rd century BC to 5th century AD), Varna as a class system is attested, but the described Varna was not a caste system. The Pali texts enumerate the four Varnas Brahmin, "Kshatriya",Vessa (Vaishya) and Sudda (Shudra). Masefield notes that people in any Varna could in principle perform any profession. The early Buddhist texts, for instance, identify some Brahmins to be farmers and in other professions. The text state that anyone, of any birth, could perform the priestly function, and that the Brahmin took food from anyone, suggesting that strictures of commensality were as yet unknown. The Nikaya texts also imply that endogamy was not mandated in ancient India. Masefield concludes, "if any form of caste system was known during the Nikaya period - and it is doubtful that it was - this was in all probability restricted to certain non-Aryan groups".

== Jain texts ==
Ādi purāṇa, an 8th-century text of Jainism by Jinasena, is the earliest mention of Varna and Jati in Jainism literature. Jinasena does not trace the origin of Varna system to Rigveda or to Purusha Sukta, instead traces varna to the Bharata legend. According to this legend, Bharata performed an "ahimsa-test" (test of non-violence), and those members of his community who refused to harm or hurt any living being were called as the priestly varna in ancient India, and Bharata called them dvija, twice born. Jinasena states that those who are committed to ahimsa are deva-Brāhmaṇas, divine Brahmins.

The text Adi purana also discusses the relationship between varna and jati. According to Padmanabh Jaini, a professor of Indic studies, Jainism and Buddhism, the Adi purana text states "there is only one jati called manusyajati or the human caste, but divisions arise account of their different professions". The varna of Kshatriya arose when Rishabh procured weapons to serve the society and assumed the powers of a king, while Vaishya and Shudra varna arose from different means of livelihood in which they specialised.

== Sikh texts ==
Sikhism is a late 15th-century religion that originated in the Punjab region of the Indian subcontinent. Sikh texts mention Varna as Varan, and Jati as Zat or Zat-biradari. Eleanor Nesbitt, a professor of Religion and specialising in Christian, Hindu and Sikh studies, states that the Varan is described as a class system in 18th- to 20th-century Sikh literature, while Zat reflected the endogamous occupational groups (caste).

The Sikh texts authored by the Sikh Gurus and by non-Sikh Bhagats such as the Namdev, Ravidas and Kabir, states Nesbitt, declared the irrelevance of varan or zat of one's birth to one's spiritual destiny. They taught that "all of humanity had a single refuge" and that the divine teaching is for everyone. Sikhism teaches a society without any varan. In practice, states Harjot Oberoi, secondary Sikh texts such as the Khalsa Dharam Sastar in 1914 argued that the entry of certain Sikh castes into major Sikh shrines should be barred. Similarly, in practice and its texts, the Gurus of Sikhism did not condemn or break with the convention of marrying (and marrying off their children) within the jati, and all the Sikh Gurus were Khatri, had Khatri wives and practiced arranged marriages within their zat. According to Dhavan, the Rahit-namas and other prescriptive Sikh texts from mid-18th century onwards accommodate and affirm the "natal and marriage traditions of different caste groups within the Sikh community".

Ravidassi Sikhs and Ramgarhia Sikhs follow their own textual and festive traditions, gather in their own places of worship. These are varna-based (caste-based) religious congregations that emerged from Sikhism, states Nesbitt. The Ravidassia group, for example, emphasizes the teachings of Bhagat Ravidas – a poet-saint born in a family whose traditional untouchable occupation related to dead animals and leather. They consider the teachings of living Gurus and the texts of Ravidass Dera as sacred and spiritually as important as the historic Sikh Gurus. This is rejected by Khalsa Sikhs. The disagreements have led the Ravidassia Sikhs to launch the Ravidassia religion movement which, amongst other things seeks to replace the Guru Granth Sahib in their Gurdwaras with the texts of Ravidas.

== See also ==
- Dalit ('untouchables')
- Adi Dravida
- Classical Hindu law
- Four occupations – fourfold Confucian division
- Hindu law
- Hindu reform movements
- Manuvāda
- Prabhat Ranjan Sarkar#Law of Social Cycle
- Trifunctional hypothesis
- Estates of the realm – comparable European concept

== Bibliography ==
- Bayly, Susan (2001), Caste, Society and Politics in India from the Eighteenth Century to the Modern Age, Cambridge University Press, ISBN 978-0-521-26434-1
- Jaini, Padmanabh (1998). The Jaina Path of Purification. Motilal Banarsidass. ISBN 978-81-208-1578-0.
- Ghurye, Govind Sadashiv (1969) [1932]. Caste and Race in India (Fifth ed.). Popular Prakashan. ISBN 9788171542055. OCLC 1066815345.
- Hiltebeitel, Alf (2011). Dharma: Its early history in law, religion, and narrative. Oxford University Press. ISBN 978-0-19-539423-8.
- Olivelle, Patrick (1998). "Caste and Purity: A Study in the Language of the Dharma Literature". Contributions to Indian Sociology. 32 (2): 199–203. doi:10.1177/006996679803200203. S2CID 144201754.
- Olivelle, Patrick (2008). "Caste and Purity". Collected essays. Firenze, Italy: Firenze University Press. ISBN 978-88-8453-729-4.
- Sharma, Ram Sharan (1990). Śūdras in Ancient India: A Social History of the Lower Order Down to Circa A.D. 600. Motilal Banarsidass Publishers. p. 10. ISBN 9788120807068.
