= Phule (film) =

2025 Hindi film by Ananth Mahadevan

- Theatrical release poster
- Directed by: Anant Mahadevan
- Written by: Anant Mahadevan; Muazzam Beg
- Produced by: Sunil Jain; Pranay Chokshi; Ritesh Kudecha; Jagdish Patel; Anuya Chauhan Kudecha; Dr. Raj Khaware
- Starring: Pratik Gandhi; Patralekha
- Cinematography: Sunita Radia
- Edited by: Raunak Phadnis
- Music by: Rohan-Rohan
- Production companies: Dancing Shiva Films; Kingsmen Productions
- Distributed by: Zee Studios
- Release date: 25 April 2025
- Running time: 129 minutes
- Country: India
- Language: Hindi
- Budget: ₹30 crore
- Box office: ₹6.21 crore

Phule is a 2025 Indian Hindi-language biographical film directed by Anant Mahadevan and produced by Dancing Shiva Films Kingsmen Productions Films and Zee Studios. The film is based on the lives of Jyotirao Phule and Savitribai Phule. The film stars Pratik Gandhi and Patralekha in titular roles. The film was scheduled to release on 11 April 2025. but was postponed to 25 April 2025.

== Cast ==
- Pratik Gandhi as Jyotirao Phule
- Patralekha as Savitribai Phule
- Vinay Pathak as Govindrao Phule
- Suresh Vishwakarma as Dr. Vishram Ghole
- Sushil Pandey as Raja Ram Phule (Baba Ji)
- Vishal Tiwari as Tatyasaheb Bhide
- Joy Sengupta as Vinayak Deshpande
- Amit Behl as Punchayat Head Brahmin
- Akshaya Gurav as Fatima Sheikh
- Jayesh More as Usman Sheikh
- Dhanjay Madrekar as Lahuji Raghoji Salve
- Darsheel Safary as Yashwant
- Asit Redij as Vishnupant Thatte
- Abhinav Patekar as Narayan Meghaji Lokhande
- Akanksha Gade as Kashibai
- Abhinav Singh Raghav as Mangal Deshpande
- Alexx O'Nell as Ribbs Johnes
- Ellie as Mrs. Ribbs Johnes

== Production ==
The biopic on Jyotirao Phule and Savitribai Phule was announced in April 2022, with Pratik Gandhi and Patralekha cast as the lead actors. Directed by Anant Mahadevan, the film aims to depict the couple's contributions to social reform and education in India. Filming began in April 2023, with key scenes shot to portray the historical narrative. The first look of the film was released on 11 July 2024, showcasing its focus on the reformers. Principal photography was completed by October 2024.

== Soundtrack ==
Phule

Soundtrack album by Rohan-Rohan
- Released: 22 April 2025
- Recorded: 2024–2025
- Genre: Feature film soundtrack
- Length: 13:06
- Language: Hindi
- Label: Zee Music Company
External audio
- Phule - Full Album on YouTube

The music of the film is composed by Rohan-Rohan while lyrics are written by Kausar Munir and Sarosh Asif.

Track listing
No.	Title	Lyrics	Singer(s)	Length
1.	"Saathi"	Kausar Munir	Monali Thakur	4:17
2.	"Dhun Lagi"	Sarosh Asif	Romy	4:33
3.	"Saathi" (Male Version)	Kausar Munir	Rohan Pradhan	4:16
Total length:				13:06

== Release ==
=== Theatrical ===
The film was initially scheduled for a theatrical release on 11 April 2025, coinciding with the 197th birth anniversary of Mahatma Jyotirao Phule. Despite originally being cleared by the Central Board of Film Certification (CBFC) with a U-certificate, the release was postponed to 25 April 2025 following protests from Brahmin organizations in Maharashtra, who claimed the film defamed their community. In response to the backlash, the CBFC requested the filmmakers make several edits. These alterations included the removal of a voiceover referencing the caste system, as well as historically accurate caste-specific terms referring to marginalized Dalit communities (such as "Mahar" and "Mang"). The board also demanded modifications to certain dialogues and visuals, such as diluting a reference to "3,000 years of slavery" and altering scenes depicting caste-based humiliation. The CBFC's demands drew heavy criticism from filmmakers, historians, and activists, who condemned the censorship as an attempt to whitewash history and downplay the lived experiences of marginalized groups. Critics pointed out the irony of censoring a film about the Phules' historic fight against caste supremacy in order to appease the very social hierarchy they opposed.

== Reception ==
=== Critical reception ===
On the review aggregator website Rotten Tomatoes, 70% of 10 critics' reviews are positive, with an average rating of 6.5/10. Saibal Chatterjee of NDTV gave 3.5 stars out of 5 and said that "Pratik Gandhi is the heart and soul of the film, Patralekhaa serves as the ideal foil and Watch Phule not only because it has something to say but also because of the way it says it—with restraint and integrity." Shubhra Gupta of The Indian Express rated 2.5/5 stars and observed that "Both Pratik Gandhi and Patralekha as Jyotiba and Savitribai do justice to their characters, the latter given more fiery oratorial chances in her pushback against oppression." Hemant Waje of rediff.com rated 3.5/5 stars and commented that "In this era of sensationalism, we should appreciate director Anant Mahadevan for treating Phule with composure and not going overboard."

Rahul Desai of The Hollywood Reporter India writes in his review that "This biopic is dry and uninspiring. Phule becomes a cinema of formalities, not expressions and ideas. It’s a pity — a film about forward-thinking figures stuck in creatively backwards waters. In this day and age, the zero-gravity chasm between readymade stories and dramatised storytelling is the biggest sci-fi device of our times." Rishabh Suri of Hindustan Times gave 3 stars out of 5 and said that "Pratik Gandhi and Patralekhaa deliver good performances. Overall, Phule is a sincere, important film, dulled by an oversimplistic screenplay and treatment." Abhishek Srivastava of The Times of India rated 3.5/5 stars and said that "Watch ‘Phule’ to witness the inspiring true story of India's first social reformers who challenged caste and gender norms with courage and conviction."

Ganesh Aaglave of Firstpost gave 3.5 stars out of 5 and said that "On the whole, Phule is a must-watch for all the Indians as it is a beautiful tribute to Jyotiba Phule and Savitribai Phule". Sana Farzeen of India Today rated 3/5 stars and said "Given how little we know of Jyotirao Phule, the first Mahatma of this country, 'Phule' definitely deserves a watch". Nandini Ramnath of Scroll.in observed that "The film itself douses the more radical aspects of Phule’s singular achievements. Pratik Gandhi is barely present, Patralekhaa marks her attendance more strongly. And so the film trundles on, from one familiar history lesson to the next." Devesh Sharma of Filmfare gave 3.5 stars out of 5 and written that "Phule may not captivate in the traditional sense of a biopic, but it succeeds in educating and honoring two of India’s most important yet often overlooked reformers. It’s a film that opens your eyes, even if it doesn’t always grip your heart." Critics of Bollywood Hungama gave 2 stars out 5 and said "PHULE tells the story of a legendary social revolutionary and rests on the towering performance of Pratik Gandhi. But the film greatly suffers on account of a weak script and lacklustre direction."

=== Political response ===
Indian National Congress MP and Leader of the Opposition in Lok Sabha Rahul Gandhi watched the film During his trip to Patna. In a post, Rahul wrote, "During my Bihar visit today, I watched the movie Phule at Inox Mall in Patna along with local social activists, and it moved me deeply. The path of education, equality, and justice is not easy. The lives, struggles, and ideals of Mahatma Jyotiba Phule and Savitribai Phule can guide our society and nation on this path today."
