= Fatima Sheikh =

19th-century Indian educator and social reformer

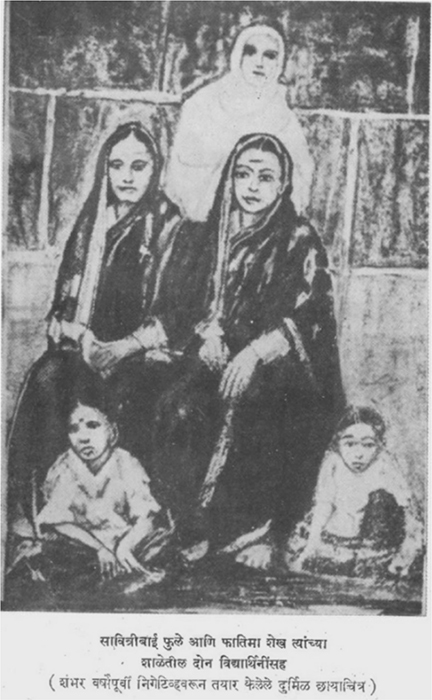
- Photograph of Savitribai Phule and Fatima Sheikh, with unidentified woman in back and two students from their school seated, c. 1850
- Occupations: Social reformer, teacher
- Known for: India's first Muslim woman teacher
- Relatives: Mian Usman Sheikh (Brother)

Fatima Sheikh was a 19th century Indian educator and social reformer, who was a colleague of the social reformers Jyotiba Phule and Savitribai Phule. Sheikh is widely regarded as India's first Muslim woman teacher and is remembered for her role in educating and empowering women and marginalised communities in the late 19th and early 20th centuries.

== Biography ==
Fatima Sheikh was the sister of Mian Usman Sheikh, a resident of Pune in the neighbourhood of Ganjpeth, who was also a friend of Jyotiba Phule. According to Nasreen Sayyed, author of a book on Fatima Sheikh, Sheikh was already literate and Usman encouraged her to receive teacher training, adding that "She went along with Savitribai Phule to the Normal School and they both graduated together. She was the first Muslim woman teacher of India."

Sheikh and Savitribai subsequently received teacher training from Cynthia Farrar, an American missionary in Ahmednagar. They established their first girls' school in a portion of Usman Sheikh's house in 1848, under the name "Indigenous Library". It was a revolutionary project since in the social milieu of those times, girls were not allowed to receive public education. The two teachers had to go house to house to promote their school and to persuade parents to send their children there.

The Phules faced resistance from Jyotiba's parents for their social work, and had to leave the ancestral home. They went to live with Usman Sheikh, and stayed there until 1856.

Fatima Sheikh taught alongside Savitribai Phule at two schools established by the Phules in July 1851, with financial support from Thomas Erskine Perry. These "Native Female Schools" educated girls from diverse caste backgrounds, teaching the more advanced students a broad curriculum including history, geography, arithmetic, and socio-economic issues. According to Jana Tschurenev, "Savitribai and Fatima Sheikh were the first Indian women teachers outside the domain of missionary supervision." Their work helped pave the way for other women to enter teaching in India and the success of the schools contributed to future government support of female education in India.

== Recognition ==
In 2014, the state of Maharashtra included a brief profile of Fatima Sheikh in Urdu language textbooks.

Many people regard 9 January as the date of her birth, using it for remembrance. On 9 January 2022, Google commemorated Sheikh with a Google Doodle marking what it referred to as her 191st birth anniversary, describing her as being "widely considered to be India's first Muslim woman teacher". However, Reeta Ramamurthy Gupta, author of a 2023 biography of Savitribai Phule, later commented for a 2025 ThePrint article that "there is no evidence to suggest that she was born on the 9th of January".

In 2022, the Andhra Pradesh government introduced Sheikh into its textbooks. In 2023, a statue of Sheikh was unveiled at an Urdu school in a town in Kurnool district, Andhra Pradesh, recognising her pioneering role in women's education in India. During the 2019–2020 Shaheen Bagh protests in Delhi, a library set up at the protest site was named after Savitribai Phule and Fatima Sheikh. Reading circles were also set up in Fatima Sheikh's name.
