= Anita Bharti =

Indian author and critic (born 1965)

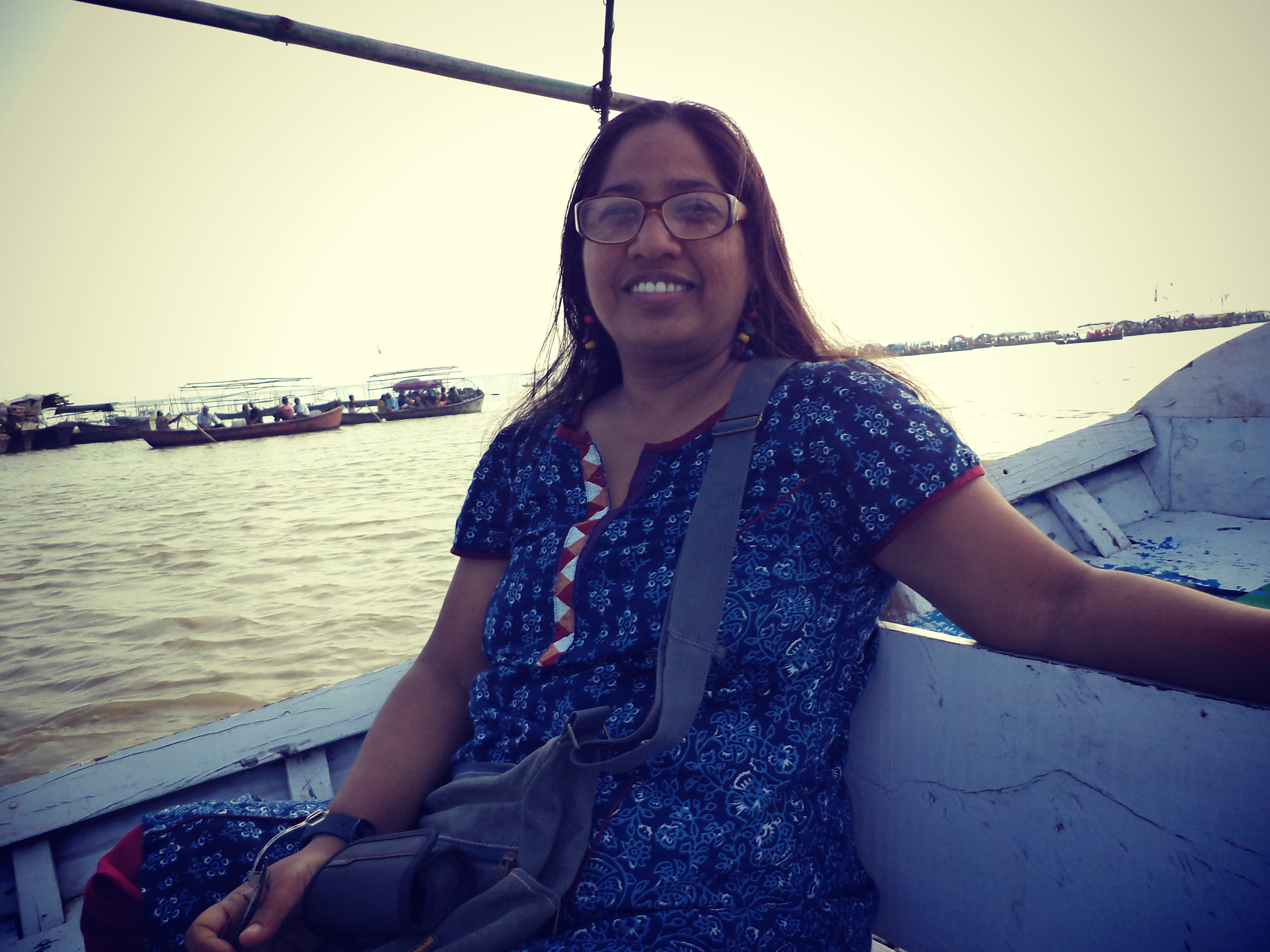
- Born: 9 February 1965 (age 61); Seelampur, Delhi
- Occupations: Writer; educator; critic; social activist
- Writing career
- Period: 2000s-present
- Subjects: Dalit literature and feminism
- Notable works: Ek Thi Quotewali (2012); Samkaleen Narivad aur Dalit Stree ka Pratirodh (2013)

Anita Bharti (born 9 February 1965) is an Indian writer, critic and activist. Considered one of the prominent figures of Hindi Dalit literature, she helped to establish Dalit feminism as a 'parallel stream' into mainstream feminism in India.

== Career ==
Anita Bharti was born on 9 February 1965 in Seelampur, Delhi. Since her student days, Deeba Zafir notes, Bharti has been active in the Dalit and women's rights organisations. She also has a career in the teaching profession.

In 2013, Bharti wrote a book called Samkaleen Narivad aur Dalit Stree ka Pratirodh (lit. 'Contemporary Feminism and the Dalit Woman's Resistance'). This book theorises the concept of Dalit feminism for the first time in Hindi, where she engaged with various prominent Dalit writers such as Urmila Pawar, Bama, amd Babytai Kamble among others. She also wrote a short story Thakur ka Kuan Part Two which, according to Laura Brueck, is a deliberate feminist correction rewriting of Premchand's famous 1932 story Thakur ka Kuan.

She is also a very vocal critic of male dominated Dalit literature. She criticises some Dalit male writers who claim to be anti-caste progressive but produce patriarchal attitudes in private and public spheres. Bharti uses the term Manuvadi to call out those writers.

== Literary works ==
- A collection of essays "Samkaleen Narivad aur Dalit Stree ka Pratirodh" (lit. 'Contemporary Feminism and the Resistance of Dalit Women')
- A short story collection "Ek Thi Quotewali aur Anya Kahaniyan" (lit. 'The Case of the Quota Candidate and Other Stories)' published in 2012.
- A poetry collection Ek Kadam Mera Bhi (lit. 'One Step of Mine Too'), 2013
