= Gulamgiri =

Indian book by Jyotiba Phule

Gulamgiri is a seminal work authored by Jyotirao Phule, a prominent Indian social activist, anti-caste reformer, thinker, and writer from Maharashtra. Originally published in Marathi in 1873, with a preface in English, the book addresses issues related to caste, slavery, and social reform, making it one of the earliest critiques of the caste system. It is described as the "‘seed text’ for an anti-brahmanical consciousness" by Omprakash Kashyap.
