= Krantijyoti Savitribai Phule =

- Written by: Shivendra Kumar
- Directed by: Rupesh D Gohil
- Creative director: Yusuf Surti
- Starring: Ketaki Kulkarni
- Country of origin: India
- Original language: Hindi
- No. of episodes: 107

Production
- Producer: Rupesh D Gohil
- Production location: Mumbai
- Production company: RDG Productions

Original release
- Network: DD National
- Release: 11 August 2016

Krantijyoti Savitribai Phule is an Indian historical drama television series Directed by Rupesh D Gohil and Produced by RDG Productions Pvt.Ltd. The drama, aired on Doordarshan National, is based on the life of Savitribai Phule.

== Plot ==
Savitribai Phule (3 January 1831 – 10 March 1897) was an Indian social reformer, teacher and poet. Along with her husband, Jyotirao Phule she played an important role in improving women's rights in India during British rule. The couple founded the first women's school at Bhide Wada in pune in 1848.. She also worked to abolish discrimination and unfair treatment of people based on caste and gender. She is regarded as an important figure of the Social Reform Movement in Maharashtra and is regarded as "Rashtramata" (The Mother of The Nation). But unfortunately majority of many Indians especially young generation is not aware of Krantijyoti Savitribai Phule and Mahatma Jyotiba Phule. The story starts with a terrifying incident of a girl burnt alive in a village in Maharashtra and while covering this news ace reporter Kavya Banerjee meets social reformer Bhaskar manjule for his review and opinion regarding the incident. Bhaskar while giving his interview gives example of Savitribai Phule and to his shock Kavya questions him about Savitribai Phule as she is completely unaware of this iconic lady. Bhaskar scolds Kavya and tells her that its very shameful being a female journalist she does not know about this great lady. Kavya feels guilty and she decides to find out more information on Savitribai Phule. Kavya on suggestion of Bhaskar manjule leaves for kudaal village near satara to meet retired professor Namdev patil who is a true follower of Savitribai Phule.

Kavya meets Namdev in his village but he refuses to give information about Savitribai Phule but later on seeing her dedication and sincerity about her work he agrees to narrate the story of Krantijyoti Savitribai Phule'.

== Cast ==
- Dollye Tomar as Savitribai Phule
- Chinmay Udgirkar as Jyotirao Phule
- Ketaki Kulkarni as Savitribai Phule (young)
- Lohitakshaya Pattnaik as Jyotirao Phule (young)
- Prafulla Kamble as Nevase Patil [Savitribai's father]
- Prerna Bhatt as Laxmibai [Savitribai's mother]
- Sandhya Kute as Aaji [Savitribai's Aaji]
- Nandkumar V. Patil as [Teacher]
- Advika Divakar as [Journalist]
- Mustafa Azad as [Rishi Bannerji]
- Punam Chandolkar as Shantabai [Dalit lady]
- Aditi Patil as Muktabai [Shantabai Daughter]
- Dr. Rajesh Aher as Pantoji [Senior Brahmin]
- Mandar Pathak as Bhinse Brahmin
- Sweekar Mathkar as Borker teacher Brahmin
- Rohan Pednekar as Shiva Villager
- Monika Ravan as Sagrika
