= Mahanayak Vasant Tu =

- Produced by: Baliram Rathod
- Starring: Chinmay Mandlekar; Nisha Parulekar
- Cinematography: Chandrakant Meher (Charles)
- Edited by: Santosh Gothaskar
- Distributed by: A.P. Communications
- Release date: November 2015
- Running time: 144 min
- Country: India
- Language: Marathi

Mahanayak Vasant Tu is a 2015 Indian Marathi language biopic film starring Chinmay Mandlekar. It is based on the life of ex Chief Minister of Maharashtra state Shree Vasantrao Naik. He was the Chief Minister of Maharashtra for more than 11 years (3 terms) from 5 December 1963 to 20 February 1975. The film stars Chinmay Mandlekar as Vasantrao Naik, Nisha Parulekar, Bharat Ganeshpure, Ravi Patwardhan, Prakash Dhotre, Jayraj Nair. The film also has a special appearance by popular actress Prajakta Mali. The film is produced by Baliram Rathod under the banner Aditie Film Production House.

Special Prosthetic makeup has been used to transform Chinmay Mandlekar to look like Shree Vasantrao Naik. Apart from make up, vfx has also been used to make it more realistic and lively. The vfx work (make-up clean up) took around 9 months to complete.

== Plot ==
Mahanayak Vasnat Tu showcases the life of Shree Vasantrao Naik, right from his childhood days to his time as the Chief Minister of Maharashtra. The film shows various stages and instances of his personal and political life, and how he over came various obstacles with the help of his foresight and positive personality. The film is set in pre independence and post independence era.

== Cast ==
- Chinmay Mandlekar as Vasantrao Naik
- Nisha Parulekar as Vatsala Naik
- Prakash Dhotre as Fulsingh Naik
- Ravi Patwardhan as Chatursingh Naik
- Bharat Ganeshpure as Balasaheb Desai
- Jayraj Nair as Satwarrao Naik
- Satish Phadke as Jambuwantrao Dhote
- Ashish Kulkarni
- Jayant Patrikar
- Yayati Rajwade
- Prajakta Mali Guest appearance

== Production ==
The Film was announced in July 2013. The filming took place in 3 schedule. Most of the shooting took place in Akola and near by places. Pusad was also a main location. The final schedule was shot in Mumbai. 4 different looks are used on Chinmay Mandlekar as he portrays Shree Vasantrao Naik from the age of 20 years to 60 years

== Soundtrack ==
Mahanayak Vasant Tu

Soundtrack album by Mandar Khare-Anant Khelkar
- Released: August 2015
- Genre: Film soundtrack
- Label: Zee Music

The film has 4 melodious songs ranging from romantic ballad to. The music and background music is composed by Mandar Khare and songs are written by Anant Khelkar, Ilahi Jamadar.

No.	Title	Length
1	"Gor Banjara"	4:16
2	"Vasant Tu"	4:38
3	"Jhankariyo Lal"	4:12
4	"Dushkaal"	3:48
