= Cynthia Farrar =

Cristian missionary, teacher in Ahemadnagar, India

Cynthia Farrar (April 20, 1795, Marlborough, New Hampshire – January 25, 1862, Ahmednagar, India) was a Christian missionary from the United States of America. She was a teacher and founded girls' schools in Bombay and Ahmednagar. She was one of the first single American women recruited as a missionary to work and live abroad. In 1848 Jyotiba Phule visited her school in Ahemadnagar and was inspired to open a school for girls in Poona (Now Pune). It was first ever school for girls founded and run by an Indian. Later Phule enrolled his wife Savitribai Phule in Farrar's school for a course of teacher training.

== Early life ==
Farrar was the daughter of Phinehas Farrar, a farmer, and Abigail Stone. At age 15, she joined the Congregational Church in Marborough, New Hampshire. She taught school in Marlborough and Boston, Massachusetts.

== Missionary to India ==
In 1826, the Marathi Mission of the American Board of Commissioners for Foreign Missions requested that a single female missionary be sent to Bombay, India to direct schools for girls there, thus relieving the wives of male missionaries of the task. The American Board and other American missionary societies had previously been reluctant to send single women missionaries abroad, but recruited Farrar for the position of Superintendent of Girls' Schools. She departed the U.S. from Boston on June 5, 1827, as part of a missionary group bound for India. She arrived in Bombay and assumed her duties on December 29, 1827. Despite opposition from some Indians to educating females, by 1829 Farrar's schools enrolled more than 400 Indian girls.

Farrar took a two-year furlough to the United States in 1837-1838 for health reasons. In 1839, she returned to India and was transferred to Ahmednagar to organize and direct schools for girls there. An Indian friend, Jyotiba Phule, visited the school and was inspired to open a school for girls in Poona (now Pune). Among Farrar's students was Savitribai Phule, a pioneering Indian feminist and educator. Savitribai enrolled in an education and teacher training program and later began teaching small group of girls with the help of Farrar. Farrar lived and worked in Ahmednagar until her death in 1862.

== Legacy ==
Farrar is often cited as the first single American woman to be sent overseas as a missionary. Actually, she was preceded by Charlotte White in India and Betsey Stockton in Hawaii, but Farrar was the first unmarried American woman to be recruited as a missionary for her abilities and qualifications and the first to spend most of her life as a missionary.
