= Rishabh =

Rishabh may refer to:

- Rishabh Pant (born 1997), Indian cricketer
- Rishabh Shukla (fl. from 1979), Indian actor
- Rishabhanatha, Jain deity
- Rishabh Girish, activist and mathematician
