= Manuvāda =

Indian political philosophy

Manuvāda (also Manuvād, Manuwād) is a political philosophy based on Manusmṛti, the foundational legal text of ancient India. Proponents of this worldview are called Manuvādis. The Manusmrti provides extensive instruction on the obligations of an individual throughout their life, and how these vary based on caste. While the Manusmrti was followed by Hindus for centuries, it has become controversial in the modern era due to its justification of the caste system and its treatment of women.

In contemporary politics, these terms are often used to distinguish one's beliefs from those advanced by Manuvāda, particularly with respect to caste.

The term Manuvāda is used by proponents of extreme Hindu nationalism for a proposed return to the societal values of traditional Hindu Dharmashastra, as governed by Manusmṛti. This would involve the return to the ancient caste system, legally abolished with the formation of the Republic of India. The term came to the fore in the politics of India in the early 2000s, during the government of the Bharatiya Janata Party, a Hindutva political party. The term came to be used for the allegation of a hidden agenda of the nationalist parties by their opponents, for example, in 2003, Uttar Pradesh Chief Minister Mayawati remarked that "the Lok Sabha had been taken over by Manuvadi forces".

== See also ==
- Caste politics in India
- Sanatani
- Hindu law
- Classical Hindu law
