= Jyotirao Phule =

Indian social activist and reformer (1827–1890)

Mahātmā Jyotirao Phule
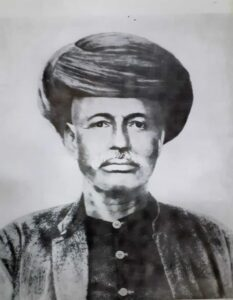
- Born: 11 April 1827; Pune
- Died: 28 November 1890 (aged 63); Pune, Bombay Presidency, British India (Maharashtra, India)
- Other names: Jyotiba Phule; Mahatma Phule
- Spouse: Savitribai Phule

Education
- Education: Scottish Mission High School, Pune (1842)

Philosophical work
- Era: 1827- 1891
- Language: Marathi
- Main interests: Ethics; humanism; education; social reformation
- Notable works: Brahmananche Kasab (1869); Shetkaryaca Asud (1883); Gulamgiri (1873); Trutiya Ratna (1855)

Jyotirao Phule (Marathi: जोतिबा फुले; pronounced [pʰule]; 11 April 1827 – 28 November 1890), also known as Jyotiba Phule, was an Indian social activist, businessman, anti-caste social reformer and writer from Maharashtra.

His work extended to many fields, including eradication of untouchability and the caste system, and educating women and oppressed caste people. He and his wife, Savitribai Phule, were pioneers of women's education in India. Phule started his first school for girls in 1848 in Pune at Tatyasaheb Bhide's residence or Bhidewada. He, along with his followers, formed the Satyashodhak Samaj (Society of Truth Seekers) to attain equal rights for people from lower castes. People from all religions and castes could become a part of this association which worked for the upliftment of the oppressed classes.

== Early life ==
Jyotirao Phule, also known as Jyotiba Phule, was born in Satara District in 1827 to a family that belonged to the Hindu Mali caste. The Malis traditionally worked as fruit and vegetable growers. In the four-fold caste hierarchy, they were placed within the Shudra category. Phule was named after the Hindu deity Jyotiba. He was born on the day of Jyotiba's annual fair. Phule's family, previously named Gorr, had its origins in the village of Katgun, near the town of Satara. Phule's great-grandfather, who had worked there as a chaughula, or low-ranking village official, moved to Khanwadi in Pune district. There, his only son, Shetiba, brought the family into poverty. The family, including three sons, moved to Poona seeking employment. The boys were taken under the wing of a florist who taught them the secrets of the trade. Their proficiency in growing and arranging became well known and they adopted the name Phule (flower-man) in place of Gorhe. Their fulfillment of commissions from the Peshwa, Baji Rao II, for flower mattresses and other goods for the rituals and ceremonies of the royal court so impressed him that he granted them 35 acres (14 ha) of land on the basis of the Inam system, whereby no tax would be payable upon it. The oldest brother machinated to take sole control of the property, leaving the younger two siblings, Jyotirao Phule's father, Govindrao, to continue farming and also flower-selling.

Govindrao married Chimnabai and had two sons, of whom Jyotirao was the youngest. Chimnabai died before he was aged one. The then backward Mali community did not give much significance to education and thus after attending primary school where he learnt the basics of reading, writing, and arithmetic, Jyotirao was withdrawn from school by his father. He joined the other members of his family at work, both in the shop and in the farm. However, a man from the same Mali caste as Phule's recognised his intelligence and persuaded Phule's father to allow him to attend the local Scottish Mission High School. (Note: The Scottish Mission school was operated by the Free Church of Scotland and educated pupils from a wide range of castes.) Phule completed his English schooling in 1847. As was customary, he was married at the young age of 13, to a girl of his Mali community, chosen by his father.

The turning point in his life was in 1848, when he attended the wedding of a Brahmin friend. Phule participated in the customary marriage procession, but was later rebuked and insulted by his friend's parents for doing so. They told him that he being from a Shudra caste should have had the sense to keep away from that ceremony. This incident profoundly affected him and shaped his understanding of the injustice inherent to the caste system.

== Social activism ==
=== Education ===
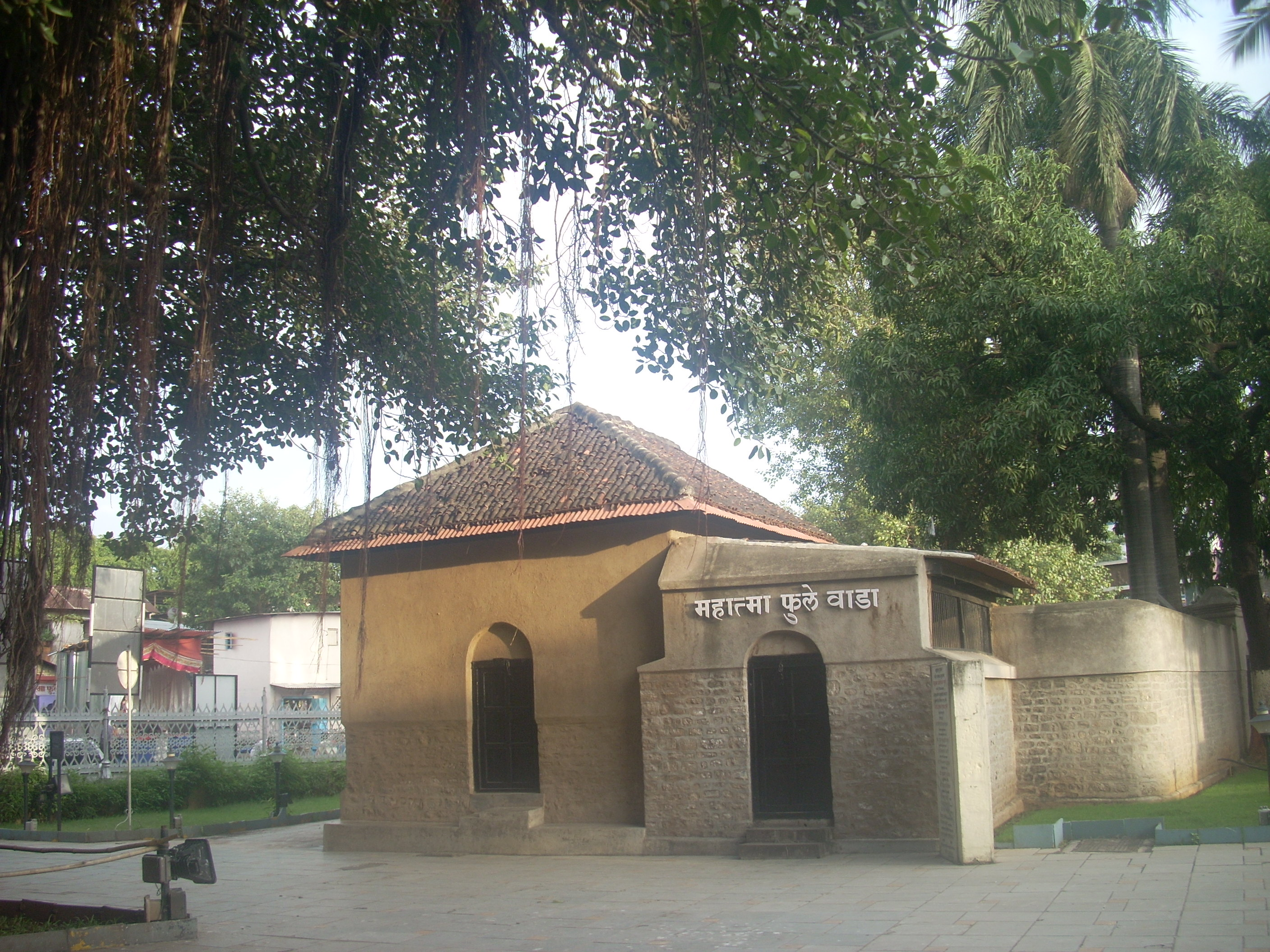
Mahatma Phule Wada, Pune. This is the place where Phule stayed with his wife Savitribai Phule for a certain period in his life. It was built in around 1852.

In 1848, aged 21, Phule visited a girls' school in Ahmednagar run by Christian missionary Cynthia Farrar. It was also in 1848 that he read Thomas Paine's book Rights of Man and developed a keen sense of social justice. He realised that exploited castes and women were at a disadvantage in Indian society, and also that education of these sections was vital to their emancipation. To this end and in the same year, Phule first taught reading and writing to his wife, Savitribai, and then the couple started the first indigenously run school for girls in Pune. (Note: The American missionary Cynthia Farrar had started a girls' school in Bombay in In 1847, the Students' literary and scientific society started the Kamalabai high school for girls in the Girgaon neighborhood of Bombay. The school is still operational in 2016. Peary Charan Sarkar started a school for girls called Kalikrishna Girls' High School in the Bengali town of Barasat in 1847. The Parsi community Mumbai had also established a school for girls in 1847.) He also taught his sister Sagunabai Kshirsagar (his maternal aunt's daughter) to write Marathi with Savitribai. The conservative upper caste society of Pune didn't approve of his work. But many Indians and Europeans helped him generously. Conservatives in Pune also forced his own family and community to ostracise them. During this period, their friend Usman Sheikh and his sister Fatima Sheikh provided them with shelter. They also helped to start the school on their premises. Later, the Phules started schools for children from the then untouchable castes such as Mahar and Mang. In 1852, there were three Phule schools in operation 273 girls were pursuing education in these school but by 1858 they had all closed. Eleanor Zelliot blames the closure on private European donations drying up due to the Rebellion of 1857, withdrawal of government support, and Jyotirao resigning from the school management committee because of disagreement regarding the curriculum.

=== Women's welfare ===
He saw young widows shaving their heads, refraining from any sort of joy in their life. He made the decision to educate women by witnessing all these social evils that encouraged inequality. He began with his wife, every afternoon, Jyotirao sat with his wife Savitribai Phule and educated her when she went to the farms where he worked, to bring him his meal. He sent his wife to get trained at a school. The husband and wife set up India's first girls' school in Vishrambag Wada, Pune, in 1848.

He championed widow remarriage and started a home for dominant caste pregnant widows to give birth in a safe and secure place in 1863. His orphanage was established in an attempt to reduce the rate of infanticide.

In 1863, Pune witnessed a horrific incident. A Brahmin widow named Kashibai got pregnant and her attempts at abortion didn't succeed. She killed the baby after giving birth and threw it in a well, but her act came to light. She had to face punishment and was sentenced to jail. This incident greatly upset Phule and hence, along with his longtime friend Sadashiv Ballal Govande and Savitribai, he started an infanticide prevention centre. Pamphlets were stuck around Pune advertising the centre in the following words: "Widows, come here and deliver your baby safely and secretly. It is up to your discretion whether you want to keep the baby in the centre or take it with you. This orphanage will take care of the children [left behind]." The Phule couple ran the infanticide prevention centre until the mid-1880s.

Phule tried to eliminate the stigma of social untouchability surrounding the exploited castes by opening his house and the use of his water well to the members of the exploited castes.

=== Views on religion and caste ===
Phule appealed for reestablishment of the reign of mythical Mahabali (King Bali) which predated "Aryans' treacherous coup d'etat". He proposed his own version of Aryan invasion theory that the Aryan conquerors of India, whom the theory's proponents considered to be racially superior, were in fact barbaric suppressors of the indigenous people. He believed that they had instituted the caste system as a framework for subjugation and social division that ensured the pre-eminence of their Brahmin successors. He saw the subsequent Muslim conquests of the Indian subcontinent as more of the same sort of thing, being a repressive alien regime, but took heart in the arrival of the British, whom he considered to be relatively enlightened and not supportive of the varnashramadharma (varna, ashrama, dharma) system instigated and then perpetuated by those previous invaders. (Note: Varnashramadharma has been described by Dietmar Rothermund as the Indian societal system that "regulates the duty (dharma) of every man according to his caste (varna) and age-grade (ashrama)".) In his book, Gulamgiri, he thanked Christian missionaries and the British colonists for making the exploited castes realise that they are worthy of all human rights. The book, whose title transliterates as slavery and which concerned women, caste and reform, was dedicated to the people in the US who were working to end slavery.

Phule saw Vishnu's avatars as a symbol of oppression stemming from the Aryan conquests and took Mahabali (Bali Raja) as hero. His critique of the caste system began with an attack on the Vedas, the most fundamental texts of Hindus. He considered them to be a form of false consciousness.

He is credited with introducing the Marathi word Dalit (broken, crushed) as a descriptor for those people who were outside the traditional varna system.

At an education commission hearing in 1882, Phule called for help in providing education for lower castes. To implement it, he advocated making primary education compulsory in villages. He also asked for special incentives to get more lower-caste people in high schools and colleges.

=== Satyashodhak Samaj ===
On 24 September 1873, Phule formed Satyashodhak Samaj to focus on rights of depressed groups such women, the Shudra, and the Dalit. Through this samaj, he opposed idolatry and denounced the caste system. Satyashodhak Samaj campaigned for the spread of rational thinking and rejected the need for priests.

Phule established Satyashodhak Samaj with the ideals of human well-being, happiness, unity, equality, and easy religious principles and rituals. A Pune-based newspaper, Deenbandhu, provided the voice for the views of the Samaj.

The membership of the samaj included Muslims, Brahmins and government officials. Phule's own Mali caste provided the leading members and financial supporters for the organisation.

== Occupation ==
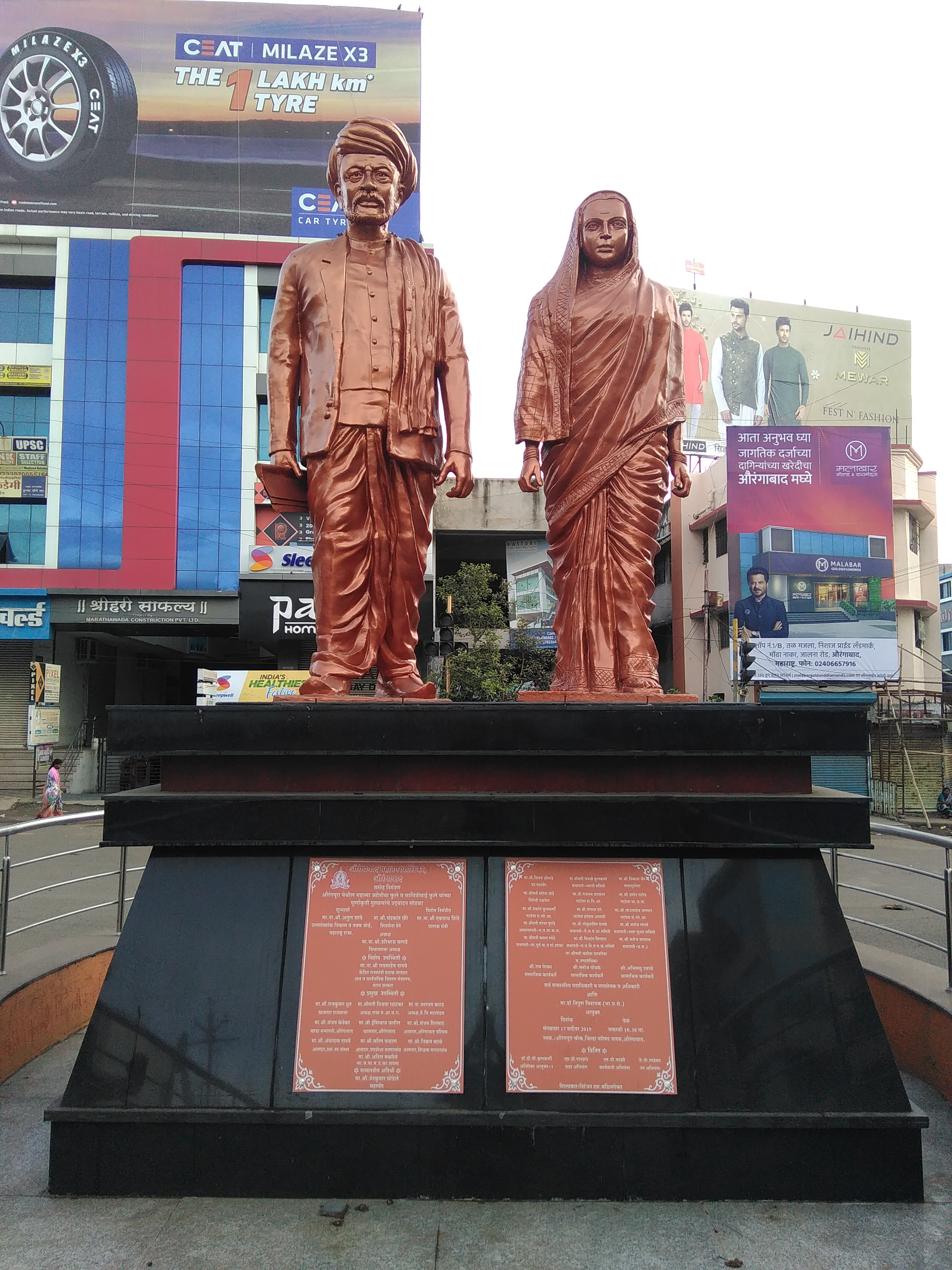
Statues of Jyotirao Phule and Savitribai Phule, at Aurangabad in Maharashtra

Apart from his role as a social activist, Phule was a businessman too. In 1882 he styled himself as a merchant, cultivator and municipal contractor. He owned 60 acres (24 ha) of farmland at Manjri, near Pune. For a period of time, he worked as a contractor for the government and supplied building materials required for the construction of a dam on the Mula-Mutha river near Pune in the 1870s. He also received contracts to provide labour for the construction of the Katraj Tunnel and the Yerawda Jail near Pune. One of Phule's businesses, established in 1863, was to supply metal-casting equipment.

Phule was appointed commissioner (municipal council member) to the then Poona municipality in 1876 and served in this unelected position until 1883.

== Published works ==
Phule's akhandas were organically linked to the abhangs of Marathi Varkari saint Tukaram. Among his notable published works are:

- Tritiya Ratna, 1855
- Brahmananche Kasab, 1869
- Powada: Chatrapati Shivajiraje Bhosle Yancha, [English: Life Of Shivaji, In Poetical Metre], June 1869
- Powada: Vidyakhatyatil Brahman Pantoji, June 1869
- Manav Mahammand (Muhammad) (Abhang)
- Gulamgiri (Slavery), 1873. 978-1714975952 (Hindi Edition), 978-9371189606 (English Edition).
- Shetkarayacha Aasud (Cultivator's Whipcord), July 1881
- Satsar Ank 1, June 1885
- Satsar Ank 2 June 1885
- Ishara, October 1885
- Gramjoshya Sambhandi Jahir Kabhar, (1886)
- Satyashodhak Samajokt Mangalashtakasah Sarva Puja-Vidhi, 1887
- Sarvajanik Satya Dharma Poostak, April 1889
- Sarvajanic Satya Dharmapustak, 1891
- Akhandadi Kavyarachana
- Asprushyanchi Kaifiyat

== Death ==
The title of Mahatma, which translates to "Great Soul" in Sanskrit, was bestowed upon Phule in 1888. In the same year, he had a stroke that rendered him paralysed. He died in Pune in 1890 at the age of 63.

== Legacy ==
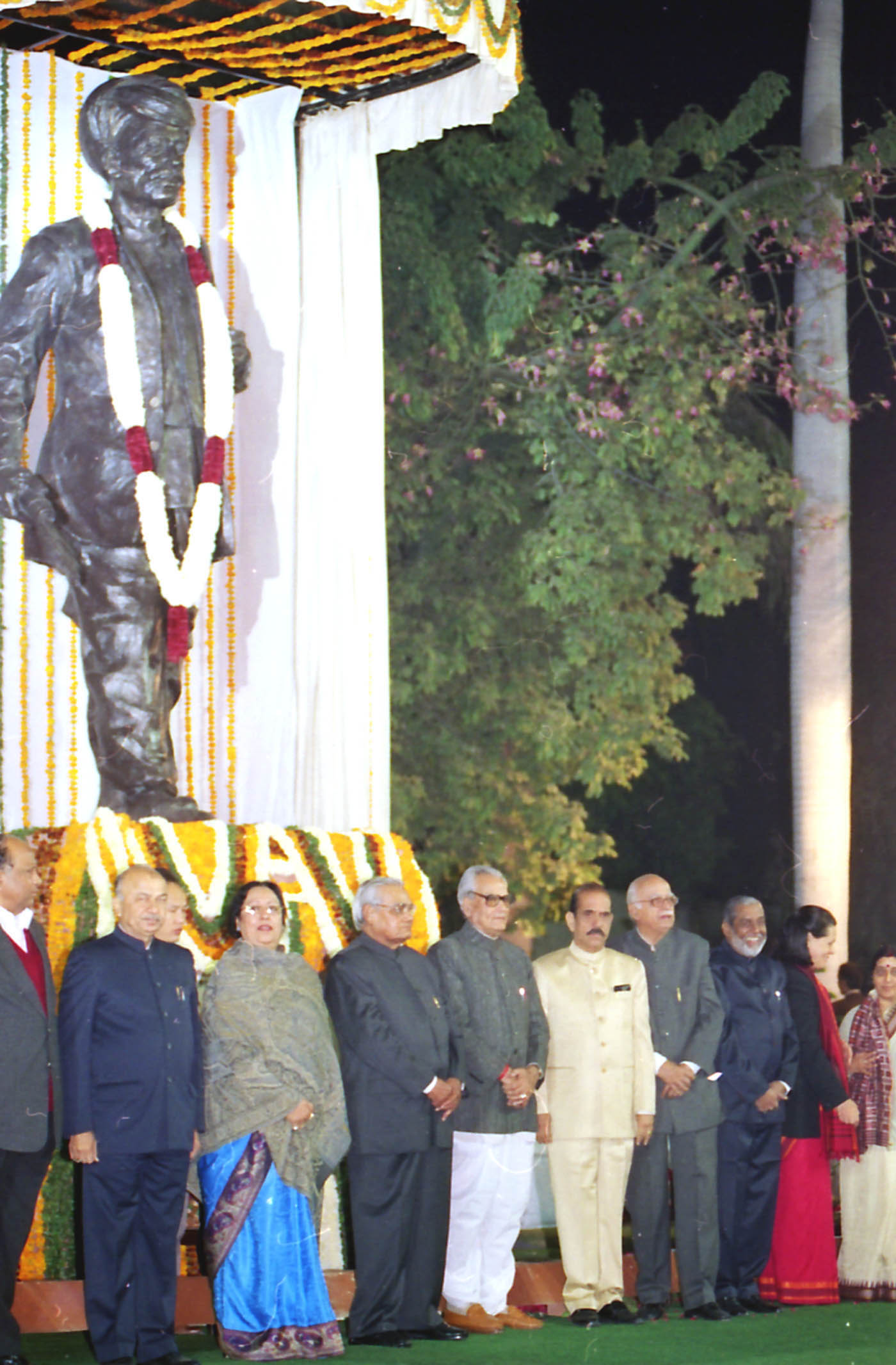
The Prime Minister Shri Atal Bihari Vajpayee unveiled the statue of Jyotirao Phule at Parliament House in New Delhi on 3 December 2003.

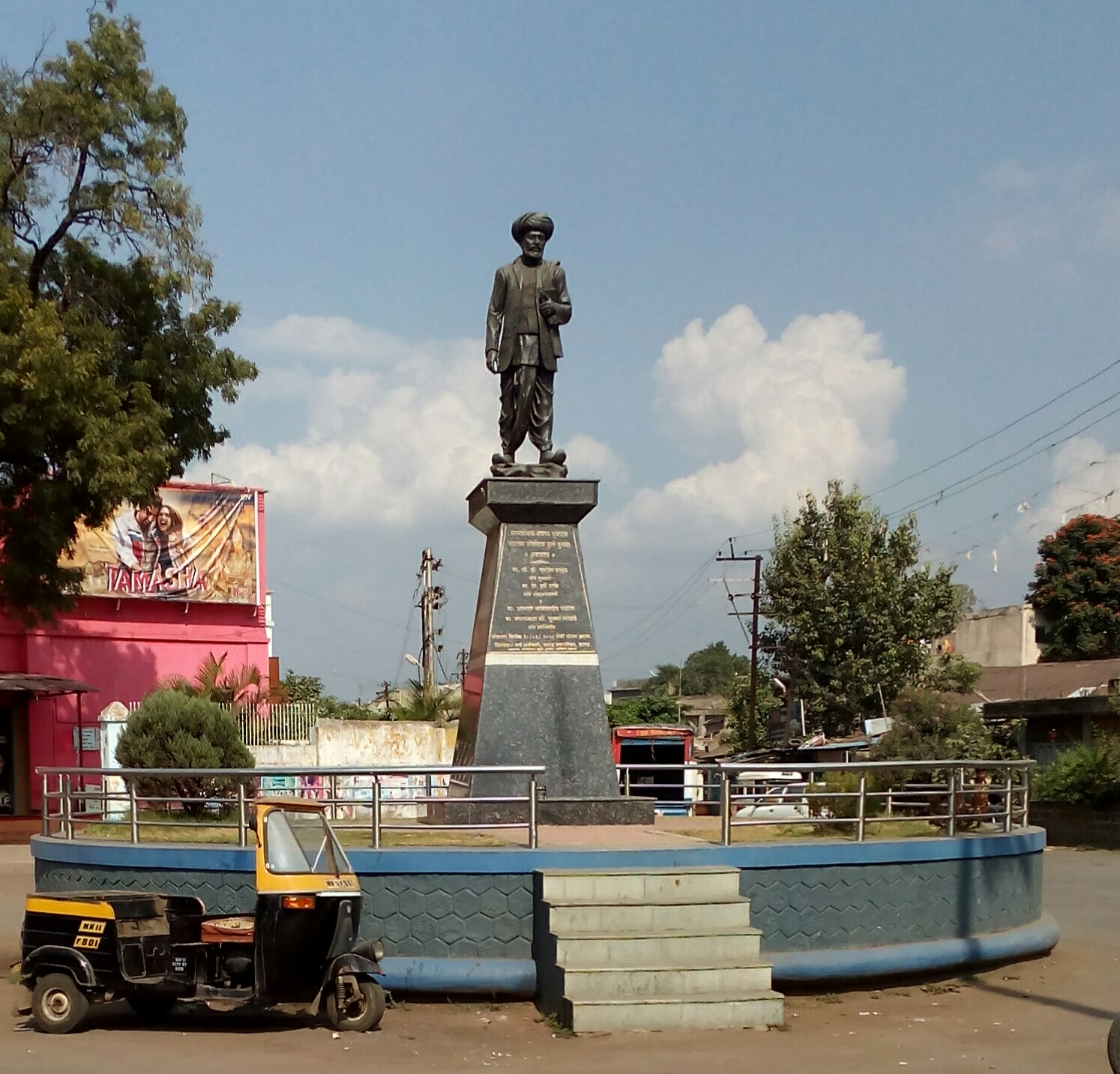
A statue of Jyotiba Phule in the town of Karad, Satara district

According to Dhananjay Keer, Phule was bestowed with the title of Mahatma on 11 May 1888 by another social reformer from Bombay, Vithalrao Krishnaji Vandekar.

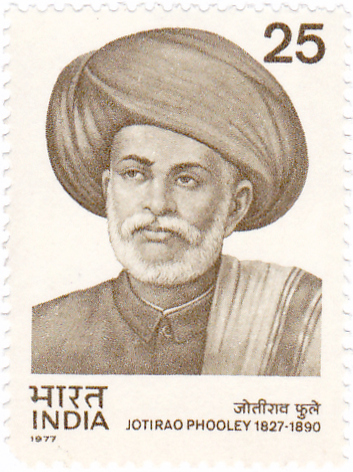

Indian Postal Department issued a postage stamp in year 1977 in the honour of Phule.

An early biography of Phule was the Marathi language Mahatma Jotirao Phule Yanche Charitra (P. S. Patil, Chikali: 1927). Two others are Mahatma Phule. Caritra Va Kriya (Mahatma Phule. Life and Work) (A. K. Ghorpade, Poona: 1953), which is also in Marathi, and Mahatma Jyotibha Phule: Father of Our Social Revolution (Dhananjay Keer, Bombay: 1974). Unpublished material relating to him is held by the Bombay State Committee on the History of the Freedom Movement.

Phule's work inspired B. R. Ambedkar, the first minister of law of India and the chief of Indian constitution's drafting committee. Ambedkar had acknowledged Phule as one of his three gurus or masters.

There are many structures and places commemorating Phule. These include:

- The full-length statue, sculpted by Narayan Laxman Sonavadekar, a sculptor and a professor at the J. J. School of Arts, Mumbai, on the premises of Vidhan Bhavan (Assembly Building of Maharashtra State)
- Mahatma Jyotiba Phule Mandai, formerly known as Crawford Market, in Mumbai
- Mahatma Phule Museum in Pune
- Mahatma Phule Krishi Vidyapeeth (Agricultural University) in Rahuri, Ahmednagar District, Maharashtra
- Mahatma Phule Mandai, formerly known as Reay Market, the biggest vegetable market in Pune
- Mahatma Phule Mandai metro station nearby was renamed in December 2025 to honour him
- Mahatma Jyotiba Phule Rohilkhand University
- Subharti College of Physiotherapy was formerly named after him.

=== In popular culture ===
- G. P. Deshpande's biographical play Satyashodhak (The Truth Seeker) was first performed by Jan Natya Manch in 1992.
- Mahatma Phule (1954), an Indian Marathi-language biographical film about the social reformer was directed Pralhad Keshav Atre.
- Krantijyoti Savitribai Phule, an Indian drama television series based on Savitribai Phule's and Jyotiba Phule's life was aired on DD National in 2016.
- Savitri Jyoti, a Marathi drama television series based on the life and work of Savitribai and Jyotiba Phule was aired on Sony Marathi in 2019- 2020.
- Savitribai Phule, an Indian Kannada-language biopic was made about Phule in 2018.
- Satyashodhak is 2024 Indian Marathi-language biographical journey through the life of Mahatma Jyotirao Phule.
- Phule is a 2025 Indian Hindi-language biographical film directed by Ananth Mahadevan. The film is based on the lives of Jyotirao Phule and Savitribai Phule. The film stars Pratik Gandhi and Patralekha in titular roles. The film was released on 25 April 2025.
