= Dhananjay Keer =

Indian writer (1913–1984)

Anant Viththal Keer
- Born: 23 April 1913; Ratnagiri, Maharashtra, India
- Died: 12 May 1984 (aged 71)
- Occupation: Biographer
- Writing career
- Pen name: Dhananjay Keer
- Language: English & Marathi
- Period: 1950–1980
- Genre: Biography
- Notable awards: Padma Bhushan

Anant Viththal Keer (1913–1984), known by his alias Dhananjay Keer, was an Indian biographer who profiled certain politicians and political activists. Keer was conferred Padma Bhushan in 1971.

== Books ==
=== Marathi ===
- Mahatma Jotirao Phule: Amchya Samajkrantiche Janak ISBN 9788171851003
- Dr. Babasaheb Ambedkar (1966)
- Lokmanya Tilak ani Rajarshi Shahu Maharaj: Ek Mulyamapan (1971)
- Vishwabhooshan Dr. Babasaheb Ambedkar: Manas Ani Tattvavichar
- Mahatma Phule : Samagra Wangmay (1969) (Coeditor S. G. Malshe)
- Krushnarao Arjun Keluskar: Atmacharitya va Charitya
- Rajarshi Shahu Chattrapati
- Krutadnya Mi Krutartha Mi (autobiography)
- Lokhitkarte Babasaheb Bole
- Teen Mahan Saraswat (1979)
- Hyani Itihas Ghadawila (1980)

=== English ===
- Veer Savarkar / Savarakar and His Times (1950)

- Keer added disclaimer on this book that it is based on "a plethora of material which was kindly made available to me by Savarkar himself and his kind interviews".

- Dr. Ambedkar: Life and Mission (1954) ISBN 978-81-7154-237-6
- Lokmanya Tilak: Father of Indian Freedom Struggle (1959)
- Mahatma Jotirao Phooley: Father of the Indian Social Revolution, 1964. Popular Prakashan ISBN 978-81-7154-066-2
- Mahatma Gandhi: Political Saint and Unarmed Prophet (1973)
- Shahu Chattrapati: A Royal Revolutionary (1976)
