= Savitribai Phule =

Indian educator and social reformer (1831–1897)

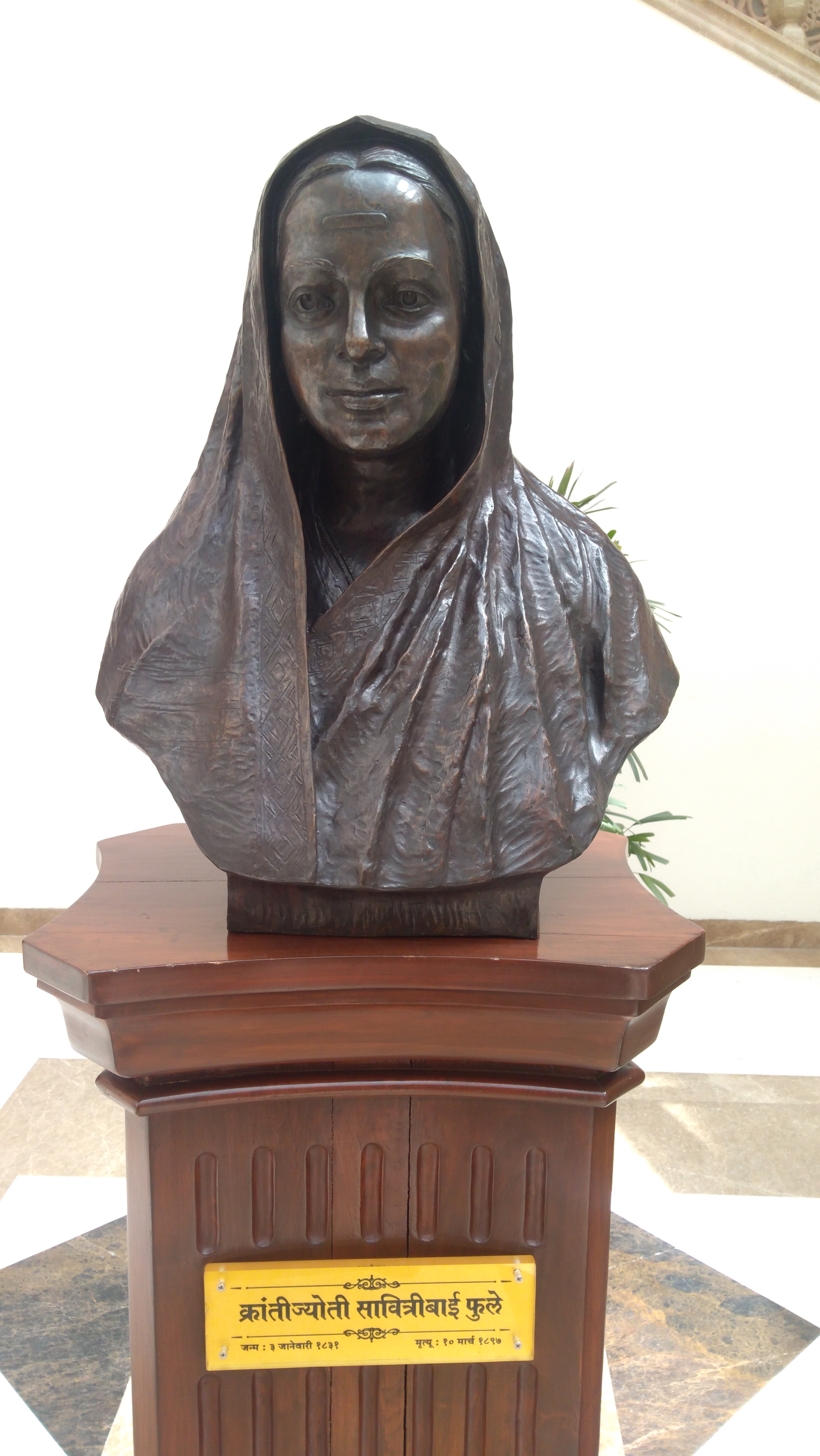
- Bust of Savitribai Phule
- Born: 3 January 1831; Naigaon, Bombay Presidency, Company India
- Died: 10 March 1897 (aged 66); Poona, Bombay Presidency, British India
- Education: Teacher's training program in Ahmednagar, normal school in Pune
- Occupations: Educator; activist; social reformer; poet
- Years active: 1848–1897
- Organization: Satya Shodhak Samaj
- Known for: Girls' education; Women's rights
- Notable work: Kavya Phule (1854); Bavan Kashi Subhodh Ratnakar (1892)
- Spouse: Jyotirao Phule

Savitribai Phule (3 January 1831 – 10 March 1897) was an Indian educator, social reformer, and poet, widely regarded as the first Indian female teacher. Along with her husband, Jyotirao Phule, she took a pivotal role in advancing women's rights and education in Maharashtra, leaving a legacy that continues to influence social reform movements across India. She is also considered a front runner of India's feminist movement. She worked to abolish discrimination and the unfair treatment of people based on caste and gender. Savitribai Phule and her husband were trailblazers in women's education in India. In 1848, together with Jyotirao and Sagunabai Kshirsagar, she established the first school for girls at the residence of Tatyasaheb Bhide, known as Bhide Wada in Pune, on a progressive syllabus of mathematics, science, and social studies, in spite of strong opposition from society. By 1851, they had established three girls' schools in Pune, with around 150 students. In total, the couple opened 18 schools. Later, she also co-founded the Satyashodhak Samaj (lit. 'Society of Truth Seekers') in 1873 and led its women's wing.

Savitribai’s career was marked by her relentless efforts in advancing education for girls and marginalized communities. Apart from opening schools, she and Jyotirao also started initiatives such as "Mahila Seva Mandal" in 1851 to promote women's rights and the "Balhatya Pratibandhak Griha", an infanticide prevention center for widows in 1853. Savitribai’s literary contributions include Kavya Phule (1854) and Bavan Kashi Subhodh Ratnakar (1892). She died of bubonic plague in 1897. Today her legacy as the "Mother of Modern Education in India" endures, commemorated through memorials, institutional names, and cultural representations.

== Early life ==
Savitribai Phule was born on 3 January 1831, in the village of Naigaon in Satara District, Maharashtra. She was the youngest daughter of four children born to Laxshmi and Khandoji Nevse Patil, both of whom belonged to the Mali community. Savitribai married Jyotirao Phule, at the age of 9 in 1840, when he was 13 years old.

== Education ==
Savitribai was illiterate at the time of her marriage. She received her education from her husband, Jyotirao Phule, and his mother figure Sagunabai Kshirsagar, who taught her to read and write at home and while working on their farm. Once she completed her primary education with Jyotirao, she continued her studies under the guidance of her mentors, Sakharam Yeshwant Paranjpe and Keshav Shivram Bhavalkar. In 1846–47, she passed the third and fourth-year examinations in an English school; in the same year, she helped Sagunabai establish a school for marginalized communities in Maharwada. She enrolled herself in two teachers' training programs: the first was at an institution run by an American missionary, Cynthia Farrar, in Ahmednagar, and the second course was at a Normal School in Pune. Savitribai became India's first formally-trained female teacher and headmistress.

== Career ==
After completing her teacher's training, Savitribai Phule started teaching girls at Pune. She did so alongside Sagunabai Kshirsagar, paternal aunt of Jyotiba Phule who was a revolutionary feminist and a mentor to Jyotirao. In January 1848, Savitribai and Jyotirao Phule, along with Sagunabai, started their own school at Bhidewada and it became India's first girls' school. Bhidewada was the home of Tatya Saheb Bhide, who was inspired by the work that the trio was doing. According to some sources, the school initially had 9 girls and later number increased to 25 students. The curriculum at Bhidewada included a traditional Western curriculum of mathematics, science, and social studies. Due to social opposition and ostracisation from orthodox community, the Phules relocated to the residence of their associate Usman Shaikh. There, Savitribai Phule and Fatima Sheikh (Usman’s sister) continued their efforts to educate girls in the local neighbourhood.

By the end of 1851, Savitribai and Jyotirao Phule were running three different schools for girls in Pune, with approximately one hundred and fifty students enrolled in total. Like the curriculum, the teaching methods employed by the three schools differed from those used in government schools. The author Divya Kandukuri believes that the Phule methods were regarded as being superior to those used by government schools. As a result of this reputation, the number of girls receiving their education at the Phules' schools outnumbered the number of boys enrolled in government schools.

Savitribai and Jyotirao Phule's success came with much resistance from the local community with conservative views. Kandukuri states that Savitribai often travelled to her school carrying an extra sari because she would be assailed by her conservative opponents with stones, cow dung, and verbal abuse. Savitribai and Jyotirao Phule were living at Jyotirao's father's home. However, in 1849, Jyotirao's father asked the couple to leave his home because their work was considered a sin as per the Manusmriti and its derived Brahmanical texts.

After moving out of Jyotirao's father's home, the Phules moved in with the family of one of Jyotirao's friends, Usman Sheikh. It was there that Savitribai met a soon-to-be close friend and colleague named Fatima Begum Sheikh. According to Nasreen Sayyed, a leading scholar on Sheikh, "Fatima Sheikh knew how to read and write already, so her brother Usman who was a friend of Jyotiba, had encouraged Fatima to take up the teacher training course. She went along with Savitribai to the Normal School and they both graduated together. She was the first Muslim woman teacher of India". Fatima and Savitribai opened a school in Sheikh's home in 1849.

In the 1850s, Savitribai and Jyotirao Phule were instrumental in establishing two educational trusts. They were entitled to the Native Male School, Pune, and the Society for Promoting the Education of Mahar, Mangs, etc. These two trusts ended up encompassing many schools which were led by Savitribai Phule and later Fatima Sheikh.

Jyotirao summarizes Savitribai and his work in an interview given to the Christian missionary periodical Dnyanodaya on 15 September 1853, saying:

It did occur to me that the improvement that comes about in a child due to the mother is very important and good. So those who are concerned with the happiness and welfare of this country should definitely pay attention to the condition of women and make every effort to impart knowledge to them if they want the country to progress. With this thought, I started the school for girls first. But my caste brethren did not like that I was educating girls and my own father threw us out of the house. Nobody was ready to give space for the school nor did we have money to build it. People were not willing to send their children to school but Lahuji Ragh Raut Mang and Ranba Mahar convinced their caste brethren about the benefits of getting educated.

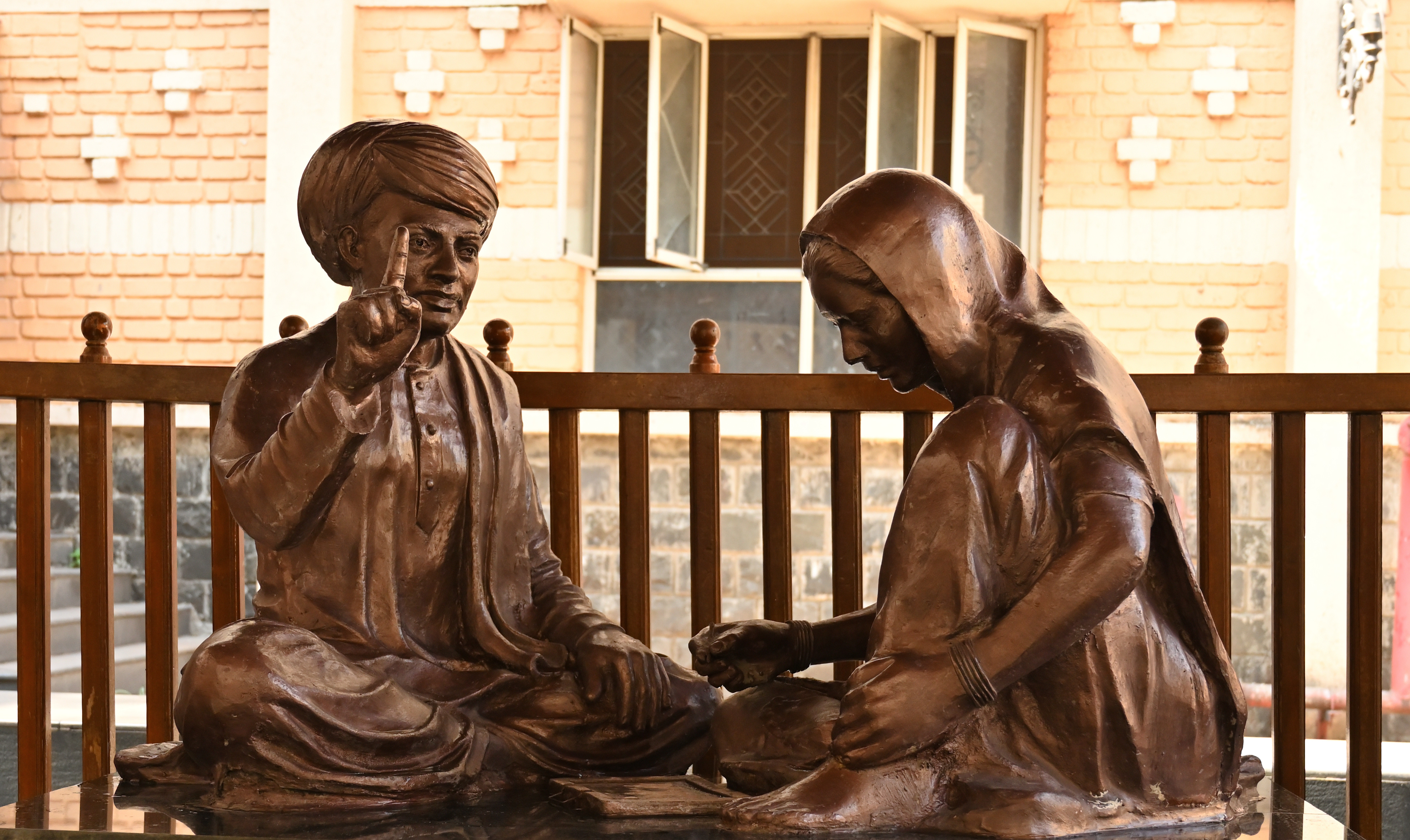
Statue of Jyotirao Phule teaching Savitribai Phule, at Pune

Together with her husband, she taught children from different castes and opened a total of 18 schools. In 1852, there were three Phule schools in operation with 273 girls pursuing education in these schools, but by 1858 they had all been closed. Eleanor Zelliot blames the closure on private European donations drying up due to the Rebellion of 1857, withdrawal of government support, and Jyotirao resigning from the school management committee because of disagreement regarding the curriculum.

In 1863, the Phule couple with their longtime friend Sadashiv Ballal Govande started an infanticide prevention centre called Balhatya Pratibandhak Griha mainly for pregnant widows. Pamphlets were stuck around Pune advertising the centre in the following words: "Widows, come here and deliver your baby safely and secretly. It is up to your discretion whether you want to keep the baby in the centre or take it with you. This orphanage will take care of the children [left behind]." The Phule couple ran the infanticide prevention centre until the mid-1880s.

== Personal life ==
Savitribai and Jyotirao had no children of their own. It is said that they adopted Yashawantrao, who was the son of a Brahmin widow. However, there is no primary evidence currently available to support this. Savitribai is believed to have arranged his marriage to the daughter of Dynoba Sasane, a worker in her organization, in February 1889.

== Death ==
Savitribai and her adopted son Yashwant opened a clinic to treat those affected by the global Third Pandemic of the bubonic plague when it appeared in the areas around Nalasopara in 1897. The clinic was established on the southern outskirts of Pune, in an area free of infection. Savitribai died after contracting the plague when tending to the son of Pandurang Babaji Gaekwad. Upon learning that he had contracted the plague in the Mahar settlement outside of Mundhwa, Savitribai Phule personally took him to the hospital. Savitribai Phule died at 9pm on 10 March 1897.

== Notable works ==
Savitribai Phule was also an author and poet. She published Kavya Phule in 1854 and Bavan Kashi Subodh Ratnakar in 1892, and also a poem entitled "Go, Get Education" in which she encouraged those who are oppressed to free themselves by obtaining an education.

== Activism ==
As a result of her experience and work, she became an ardent feminist. She established the Mahila Seva Mandal to raise awareness for issues concerning women's rights. Savitribai also called for a gathering place for women that was free of caste discrimination or differentiation of any kind. Symbolic of this was that all the women that attended were to sit on the same mat. She was also an anti-infanticide activist. She opened a women's shelter called the Home for the Prevention of Infanticide, where Brahmin widows could safely deliver their children and leave them there to be adopted if they so desired. She also campaigned against child marriage and was an advocate of widow remarriage.

In a letter to her husband Jyotirao, Savitribai told the story about a boy about to be lynched by his fellow villagers for having relations with a woman of lower caste when Savitribai intervened. She wrote, "I came to know about their murderous plan. I rushed to the spot and scared them away, pointing out the grave consequences of killing the lovers under British law. They changed their mind after listening to me".

Savitribai Phule, in addition to her pioneering role as a teacher and champion of girls' education, also founded the "Mahila Seva Mandal" and the "Balhatya Pratibandhak Griha" to support women's rights, widows and the victims of sexual violence.

== Legacy ==
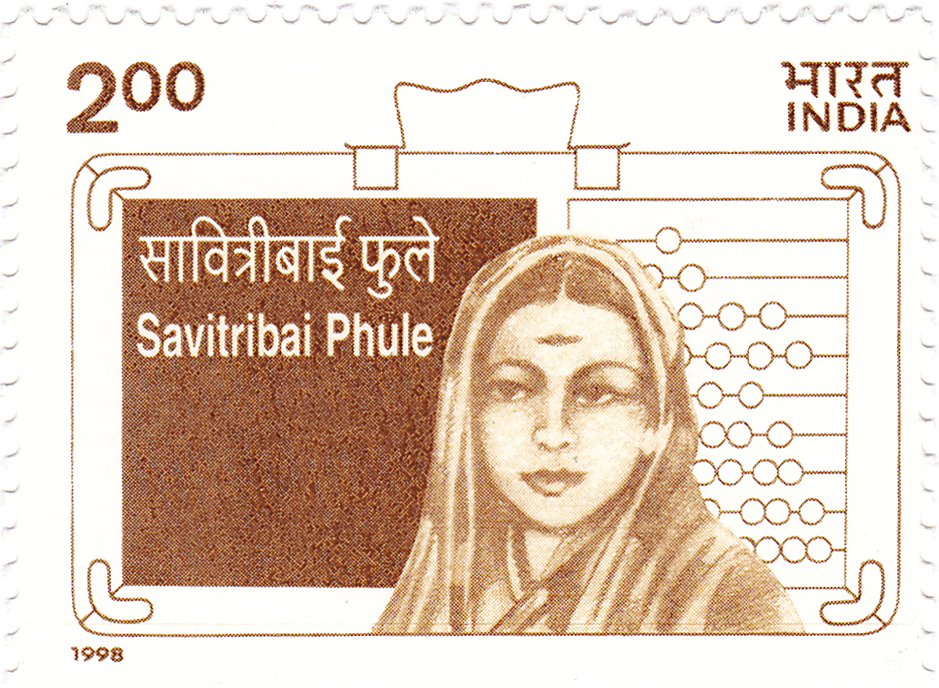
Savitribai Phule 1998 stamp of India

Savitribai Phule is widely recognised as the "Mother of Modern Education in India". Despite often being viewed through the lens of her association with Jyotirao Phule, scholars have noted that she developed an independent perspective shaped by her lived experiences as a lower-caste woman. According to political scientist Bidyut Chakrabarty, she envisioned an India free from gender and caste oppression, and considered "education" a most powerful tool to awaken self-respect among the oppressed and challenge Brahmanical dominance. Her 1854 poetry collection "Kavya Phule" reflects her thoughts on social emancipation, particularly concerning the upliftment of Shudras and women. Chakrabarty argued that Savitribai Phule was the sole female reformer of 19th-century India to explore the interplay of patriarchy with caste. Biographer Dhananjay Keer, in his work on Jotirao Phule, expressed regret over the inadequate recognition given to Savitribai’s contributions. He highlighted her decision to leave the security of her in-laws' home, endure hardships alongside Jotirao, and become the first native female teacher in India. Keer remarked, "There is hardly any parallel example in the nineteenth century that can be compared to Savitribai's noble life devoted to the cause of the uplift of the Indian woman."

Contemporary English newspapers like the Poona Observer and Deccan Weekly Reporter described the Phules' efforts as "the heralding of a new age in the history of Hindu culture".

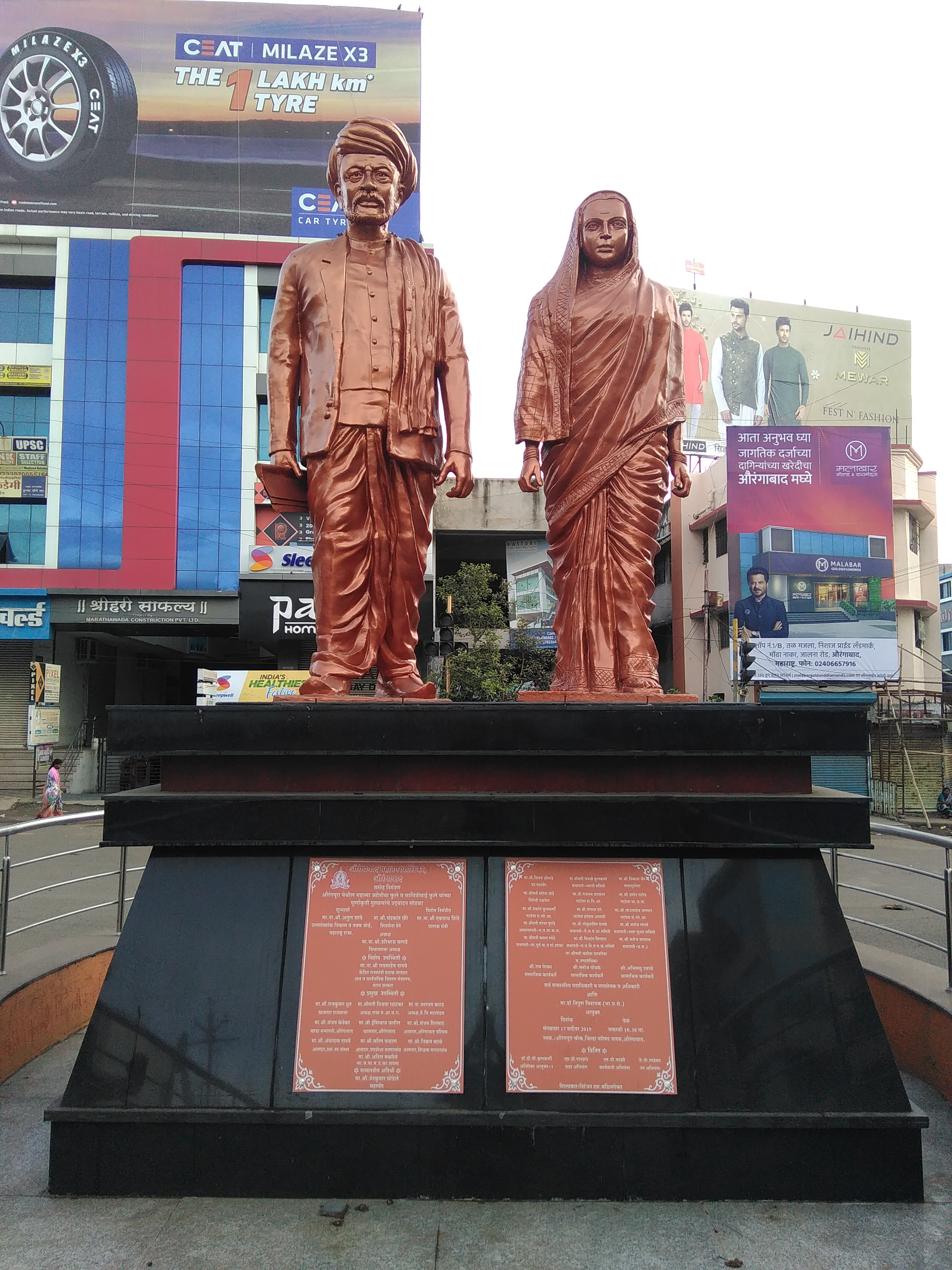
Statues of Jyotirao Phule and Savitribai Phule, at Aurangabad in Maharashtra

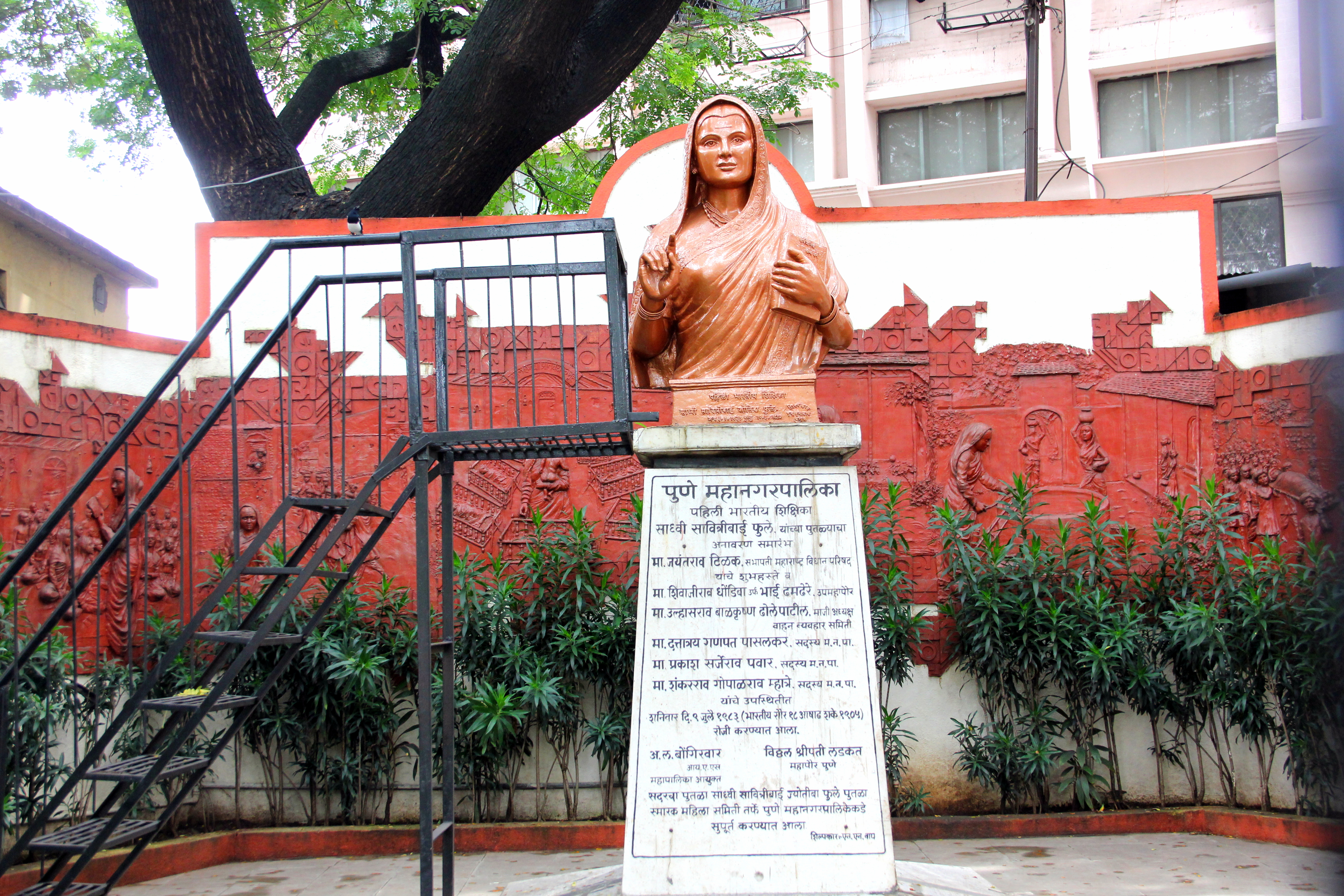
Bust of Savitribai Phule in Pune

Savitribai Phule's legacy of work for girls' and women's education lives on today. Savitribai is also considered an important figure in Dalit feminism. Writer and critic Anita Bharti refers her as the backbone of the Dalit feminist movement and an ideal for the Indian feminist movement as a whole.

- Along with B. R. Ambedkar and Annabhau Sathe, Phule has become an icon in particular for the backward classes. Women in local branches of the Manavi Hakk Abhiyan (Human Rights Campaign, a Mang-Ambedkarite body) frequently organize processions on their Jayanti (birthday in Marathi and other Indian languages).
- Pune City Corporation created a memorial for her in 1983.
- On 10 March 1998 a stamp was released by India Post in honour of Phule.
- Savitribai's birthdate, 3 January, is celebrated as Balika Din (lit. 'Girl Child Day') in the state of Maharashtra, especially in girl's schools.
- In 2015, the University of Pune was renamed as Savitribai Phule Pune University in her honour.
- On 3 January 2017, the search engine Google marked the 186th anniversary of the birth of Savitribai Phule with a Google doodle.
- A newly discovered species of flowering plant found in Khairi-Umred forest in 2026 was named Crotalaria phulei in her honor in 2026.

== In popular culture ==
- Krantijyoti Savitribai Phule, an Indian drama television series based on her life aired on DD National in 2016.
- iSavitri Jyoti, a Marathi drama television series based on the life and work of Savitribai and Jyotirao Phule aired on Sony Marathi in 2019–2020.
- Savitribai Phule, an Indian Kannada-language biopic was made about Phule in 2018.
- In 2021, Pune University created a 12.5-foot, life-size bronze metal statue of Phule. It was inaugurated in 2022.
- Phule, a Hindi-language biopic on Jyotirao and Savitribai Phule, was released in 2025. It stars Pratik Gandhi as Jyotirao Phule and Patralekha as Savitribai Phule.

== See also ==
- Jyotirao Phule
- Satyashodhak Samaj
- Women in India
