= Rabindra Guha =

Bengali Poet (Born: 1934)

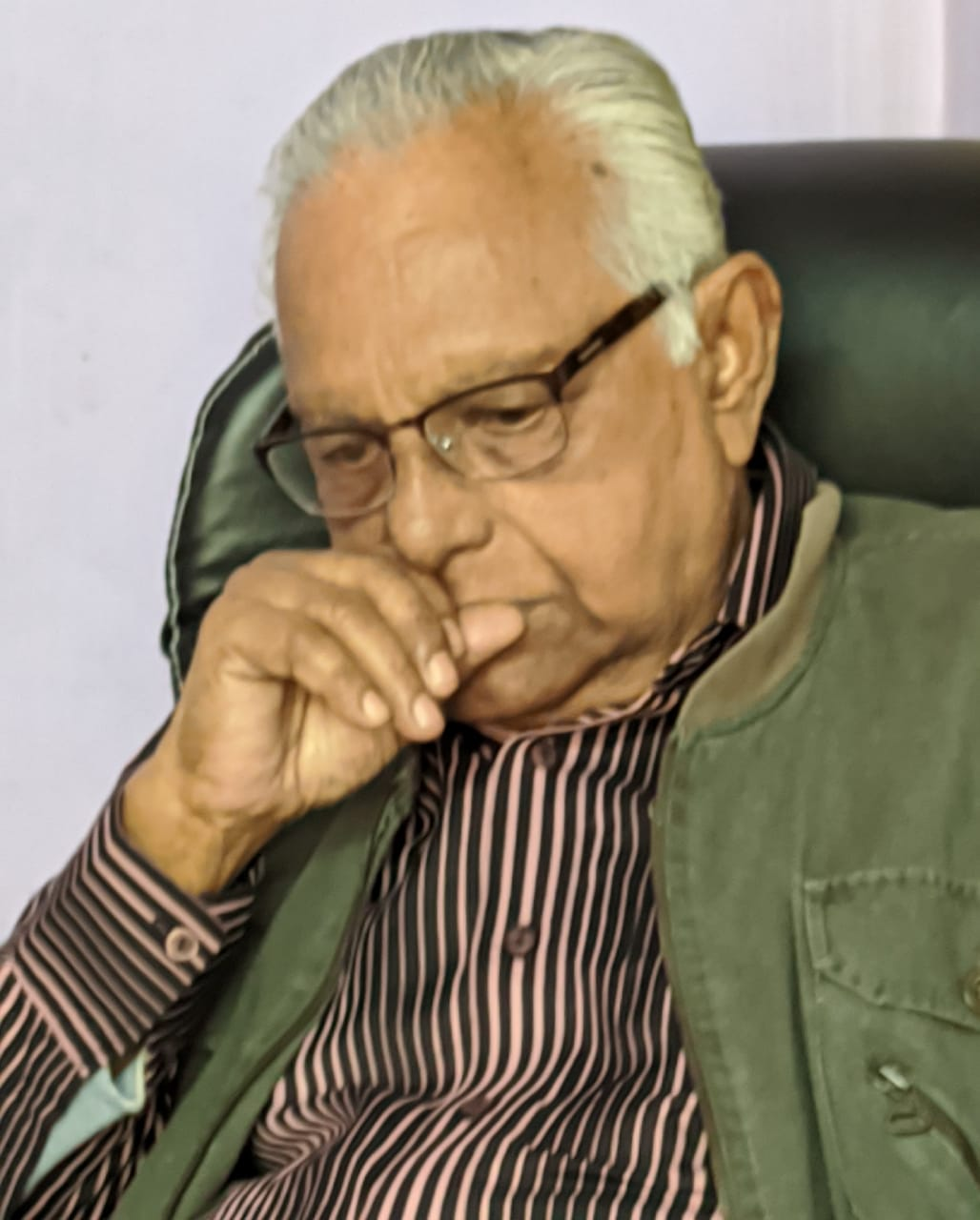
- Rabindra Guha
- Born: 25 October 1934
- Occupations: Novelist; essayist; story-writer; poet
- Writing career
- Language: Bengali

Rabindra Guha (Bengali: রবীন্দ্র গুহ) (born 25 October 1934) is a Bengali poet of the Hungry generation movement in literature who subsequently started the Neem Sahitya Andolan with Mrinal Banik and Biman Chattopadhyay from the steel factory city of Durgapur in West Bengal. He has written several collections of poetry, short stories and novels. He is known mainly for the language of the Bengali diaspora which he adopted and developed for his narratives. He lived in Kolkata until the Hungry generation movement died down at the end of the 1960s, and shifted thereafter to Durgapur. At the end of 1970s, he shifted his base to New Delhi where he invented his narrative language of the Bengali diaspora, i.e. of people who live outside West Bengal. Rabindra Guha is a diasporic post-modern writer with a prolific body of work in relation to inner as well as outer diaspora. He has been a creator of language which is a fantastic combination of national and local dialect. His work had been recently accoladed in Jessore University.

== Career ==
Rabindra Guha came to India with his parents during the Partition of India and toiled for a foothold. He was good at studies and chose the profession of a management adviser to various institutions. He left his profession to become a full-time writer when he shifted to New Delhi. There with his son he started a venture in television production. A group which called itself Dilli Haaters developed around him. Prominent members of that literary group included Dipankar Dutta, Pranji Basak, Dilip Foujdar, Krishna Mishra Bhattacharjee, etc.

== Works ==
=== Novels ===
- Rajputanar Itikatha ( Novel ) 1965.
- Prem Atakna Santras ( Novel ) 1966.
- Padadhwani Protidhwani ( Novel ) 1966.
- Mebarer Patan ( Novel ) 1967.
- Loharia ( Novel ) 1969.
- Dahan ( Novel ) 1969.
- Drohopurush ( Novel ) 1998.
- Surjer Saat Ghora ( Novel ) 1999.
- Navikunda Ghirey ( Novel ) 2000.
- Shikanjer Pakhi Khamosh ( Novel ) 2001.
- Dhundhlaa ( Novel ) 2003.
- Aami Dagdha Ekjon Manush ( Memoirs ) 2004.
- Natokey Lipsa Nei ( Drama )
- Ihadilli Shaharnamaa 2018.
- Ujan Dahar 2007
- Aami O Aamar Dibasdogdho Bondhura-- Uhara Tahara (autobiografical novel) 2018
- Phana 2012 (novel)
- Uromanush uppakhan 2019 (Novel)
- Prose-- Kano Likhi Kivabey Likhi ( Collection of prose and readers reaction) 2012
- Bad Banglar Kabitay Ritir Biparit Riti 2019
- Kranti Britter Pala 2018 (Dumdum Junction Publication)
- Nibas Kolkata 2022 (Novel) (Sristisukh Publication)
- Bangla Kobitai Ritir Biparit Riti. 2023
- Upanyas Samagra.(A Collection of Novels) 2023
- Nirbachita Upakhyan 2023

=== Short stories ===
- Janamanush ( Short Story ) 1981.
- Joiguner Padma ( Short Stories ) 1998.
- Galper Bhuban ( Short Story ) 2001.
- Sammukhe Furnace 1985
- Shrestha Galpo (A collection of short stories) 2022.

=== Poetry ===
- Rabindra Guhor Kobita ( Poetry ) 1980.
- Nirbachito Kobita ( Poetry ) 1994.
- Doridra Juboraj ( 8Poetry ) 1996.
- Hasan Tariker Rupali Ilish ( Poetry ) 2003.
- Dilli Haatars ( Poetry ) 2003.
- Ong Udghurna Bajrojoni Aswakhurdhoni Ong 2006

== See also ==
- Samir Roychoudhury
- Hungry generation
- Malay Roy Choudhury
- Tridib Mitra
- Falguni Roy
- Shakti Chattopadhyay
- Anil Karanjai
- Subimal Basak
- Sandipan Chattopadhyay

== Sources ==
- Chinho 27th Edition. Edited by Shaheed Iqbal, Chinho Foundation Org Publishers, August 2014.
- Haowa49 Rabindra Guha Special Issue. Edited by Samir Roychoudhury, Haowa49 Publishers, Kolkata 2003.
- Neem Sahitya Bettanto. Edited by Mrinal Banik, Durgapur, West Bengal. 2004
- Shahar Rabindra Guha Special Issue. Edited by Ajit Ray, Shahar Publishers, Dhanbad, Jharkhand. 2002.
- Rarher Chhotogalpo by Dr. Uttam Das. Mahadiganta Publishers, Kolkata 700 144.
- Bodh Neem Sahitya Special Issue. Edited by Arunkumar Chattopadhyay, Rupnarayanpur, Bardwan, West Bengali. 2002.
- Swapno Rabindra Guha Special Issue. Edited by Dr. Bishnu Chandra De. Swapna Publications, Badarpur, Assam. 2009.
