= Binoy Majumdar =

Bengali poet (1934–2006)

- Born: 17 September 1934; Burma
- Died: 11 December 2006 (aged 72); Shimulpur, Thakurnagar, West Bengal, India
- Citizenship: Indian
- Occupations: Poet, writer
- Writing career
- Language: Bengali
- Notable awards: Sahitya Akademi Award
- Movement: Hungry generation

Binoy Majumdar (Bengali: বিনয় মজুমদার; 17 September 1934 – 11 December 2006) was a Bengali poet who received the Sahitya Akademi Award in 2005.

== Biography ==
Binoy Majumdar was born in Myanmar (then Burma) on 17 September 1934. His family later moved to what is now Thakurnagar, West Bengal in India. Binoy loved mathematics from his early youth. He completed his 'Intermediate' (pre-University) studies at Presidency College, University of Calcutta. Although he graduated with a degree in mechanical engineering from Bengal Engineering College ( now Indian Institute of Engineering Science & Technology IIEST, Shibpur), in 1957, Binoy turned to poetry later in life. He translated a number of science texts from the Russian to Bengali. When Binoy took to writing, the scientific training of systematic observation and enquiry of objects found a place, quite naturally, in his poetry. His first book of verse was Nakshatrer Aloy (In the Light of the Stars). However, Binoy Majumdar's most famous work is Phire Esho, Chaka (Come back, O Wheel, 1960 - Here the Bengali word for Wheel, Chaka, most likely refers to the surname of Gayatri Chakravorty), written in the format of a diary. The book is dedicated to Gayatri Chakravorty Spivak, a fellow-Calcuttan and contemporary of Majumdar.

== Hungry generation ==
During the 1960s, he had joined the Hungry Generation movement for a short time but departed due to differences with its leader, Shakti Chattopadhyay. However, he had published several poems in the Hungryalist bulletins and one of them viz., 'Ekti Ujwal Maach' became quite famous and popular among academicians. After his disagreement with Shakti Chattopadhyay and Sandipan Chattopadhyay, he had himself written a Hungryalist broadside against them. He supported Malay Roy Choudhury during his 35-month trial.

== His work ==
The book, Phire Esho, Chaka, opens with the lines:

ekti ujjwal maachh ekbar ure
drishyata sunil, kintu prakrita prastabe swachchha jale
punoray dube gelo - ei smita drishya dekhe niye
bedonar gaarho rashe aapakka raktim holo fal

— (transliterated)
Translation:

One bright fish flew once
Only to sink again into the visibly blue, but truly
Transparent water - watching this pleasing sight
The fruit blushed red, ripening in a deep abyss of pain.

The period from 1958 to 1962 saw Binoy's poetry thrive. Apart from Phire Esho, Chaka, he wrote other books, such as: Nakshatrer Aaloy (In the light of the stars), Eeshwariyo (Godly), Adhikantu (Excessive), Aghraaner Anubhutimala (The emotions of the month of Aghran), Balmikir Kabita (The Poetry of Balmiki). An anthology of Binoy's poems was published named Binoy Majumdarer Srestho Kabita (Selected Poems of Binoy Majumdar) in 1981.

In the 1980s and 1990s, Binoy was affected by severe mental illness. He tried to commit suicide several times, and stopped writing poetry altogether. Also, the medical treatment he received was inadequate. He moved to the outskirts of Calcutta, in Thakurnagar, and lived with local town folks, a stranger amidst strangers.

Binoy passed into obscurity in his later years, suffering from senility and lived in social seclusion and neglect. He did not have a family.

Binoy Majumdar died on 11 December 2006 at the age of 72.

== Poetic legacy ==
Binoy has often been regarded by critics as a true successor of Jibanananda Das, the poet who revolutionized Bengali poetry in the post-Tagore era. Like Jibanananda, Binoy drew his material from bountiful nature, the fields and the jungles and the rivers and the fauna of Bengal. But Binoy's originality lay in his attempt to relate the various elements of nature to one another through objective logic and scientific enquiry. In this respect, some critics like Aryanil Mukhopadhyay, refer to the genre of his work as scientific field journal. Binoy Majumdar was bold and revolutionary in the depiction of sexuality in Poetry. He abundantly used vivid imagery which were sensually potent and Freudian in essence. In a series of pieces (Aamar Bhuttay Tel etc.), where he gives an explicit and graphic description of sexual intercourse, Binoy, once again, lays strong emphasis on the physiology of the process, and takes to a journalistic narration. Binoy was one of the original participants in the Hungry Generation হাংরি আন্দোলন literary movement spearheaded by Shakti Chattopadhyay, Samir Roychoudhury and Malay Roy Choudhury.

Binoy has always been somewhat obscure among readers of Bengali poetry. He was quite ahead of his time in breaking norms of contemporary literature. Some of his poems are difficult to decipher at first glance and require multiple readings. His writings are unconventional because they often appear as neutral scientific reportage, rather than romanticized poetry. In this, Binoy readers can perhaps trace back his background as a Mathematician. Binoy builds up all his imagery, nuances, lyricism, and poetic discovery on the skeleton of scientific reasoning and factual observations.

Binoy Majumer used mathematical concepts in his poetry, which led to his work being misunderstood by many Bengali poets. Despite this, his work remains exceptional. During last few years Professor Narayan Ch Ghosh, mathematician, has analysed his poems from mathematical stand point. Professor Ghosh has written number of articles on the writings of Binoy Majumder analysing mathematical aspects of Binoy's poems. According to Ghosh Phire Esho, Chaka (Come back, O Wheel) published during 1960 was reflection of Binoy's mind for recalling progress - wheel symbolizes. Ghosh described Binoy's 'Balmikir Kabita' as a continuation of Ratnakar Balmiki (first poet) through 'Balmikir Pratibha' by Rabindranath Thakur. Ghosh stated that Binoy's poem 'Eka Eka Katha Bali'is a Lyrics to Lonely Talk like a vision of poetic melancholy by John Milton Or like 'Teach me half the gladness/That thy brain must know;/Such harmonious madness/ From my lips would flow,/The world should listen then, as I am listening now' by Percy Bysshe Shelley. Though he knew his predecessor Bankim Chandra, first successful Novelist in Bengali - Binoy's mother tongue, had written Keo Kakhno Eka Thakiona. (No one lives alone).

== Awards ==
- Rabindra Puraskar for his 'Kabyasamgra 2' ( 2nd Poem Collection) in 2005.
- Sahitya Akdemi Award for 'Haspatale Lekha Kabitaguchha' (Poetry Written in Hospital) in 2005.
- Sudhindranath Dutta Puraskar
- Krittibas Puraskar

== See also ==
- Subimal Basak
- Tridib Mitra
- Basudeb Dasgupta
- Anil Karanjai
