= Falguni Roy =

Bengali poet (1945-1981)

Falguni Roy (/ˈfælɡʊni/; 1945–1981) was an anti-establishment Bengali poet born in Kolkata, West Bengal, India. Along with Shakti Chattopadhyay, Malay Roy Choudhury, Samir Roychoudhury, Subimal Basak, Debi Roy (Haradhon Dhara), Utpal Kumar Basu, Binoy Majumdar, Sandipan Chattopadhyay, Basudeb Dasgupta, Roy was also associated with the Hungryalist movement. Anti-establishment poet Tushar Roy was his brother.

== Film ==
An experimental short film about Roy, Ebang Falguni (The Lost Lines Of A Beauty Monster), was shown at foreign film festivals. Entirely shot on DVcam, score is composed by Monomix, and runs just over 21 minutes. This film had two screenings at the River To River Florence Indian Film Festival, Florence, Italy, 8 and 11 December 2004. It featured in Indian Short Shorts section with English and Italian subtitles. It was produced by Subhankar Das and directed by Sharmi Pandey.

== Famous poems ==
He is famous for his book Nashto Atmar Television ([নষ্ট আত্মার টেলিভিসন] which literally means: "Television of the Rotten Soul") published on the Independence Day of 1973, a day considered to be the date signifying the end of Modernism in Bengali poetry. Some of his poems published in the anthology Amar Rifel Amar Bible athoba Falguni Royer Falguni Roy are:

- "Amar Rifle amar Bible" (আমার রাইফেল আমার বাইবেল)
- "Manik Bandyopadhyayer Choshma" (মানিক বন্দ্যোপাধ্যায়ের চশমা)
- "Kritrim Saap" (কৃত্রিম সাপ)
- "Aamader Swapno" (আমাদের স্বপ্ন)
- "Kobita Bullet" (কবিতা বুলেট)
- "Biplober Gaan" (বিপ্লবের গান)
- "Aami Aamar Moton" (আমি আমার মতন)
- "Manusher songe kono Birodh Nei" (মানুষের সঙ্গে কোনো বিরোধ নেই)
- "Nashto Atmar Television" (নষ্ট আত্মার টেলিভিসন)
- "Sesh Bibriti" (শেষ বিবৃতি)
- "Baektigato Bichhana" (ব্যক্তিগত বিছানা)

== See also ==
- Shakti Chattopadhyay
- Malay Roy Choudhury
- Subimal Basak
- Basudeb Dasgupta
- Tridib Mitra
- Samir Roychoudhury
- Sandipan Chattopadhyay
- Hungry generation
- Binoy Majumdar
- Sandipan Chattopadhyay
