= Rajkamal Choudhary =

Indian poet and writer (1929–1967)

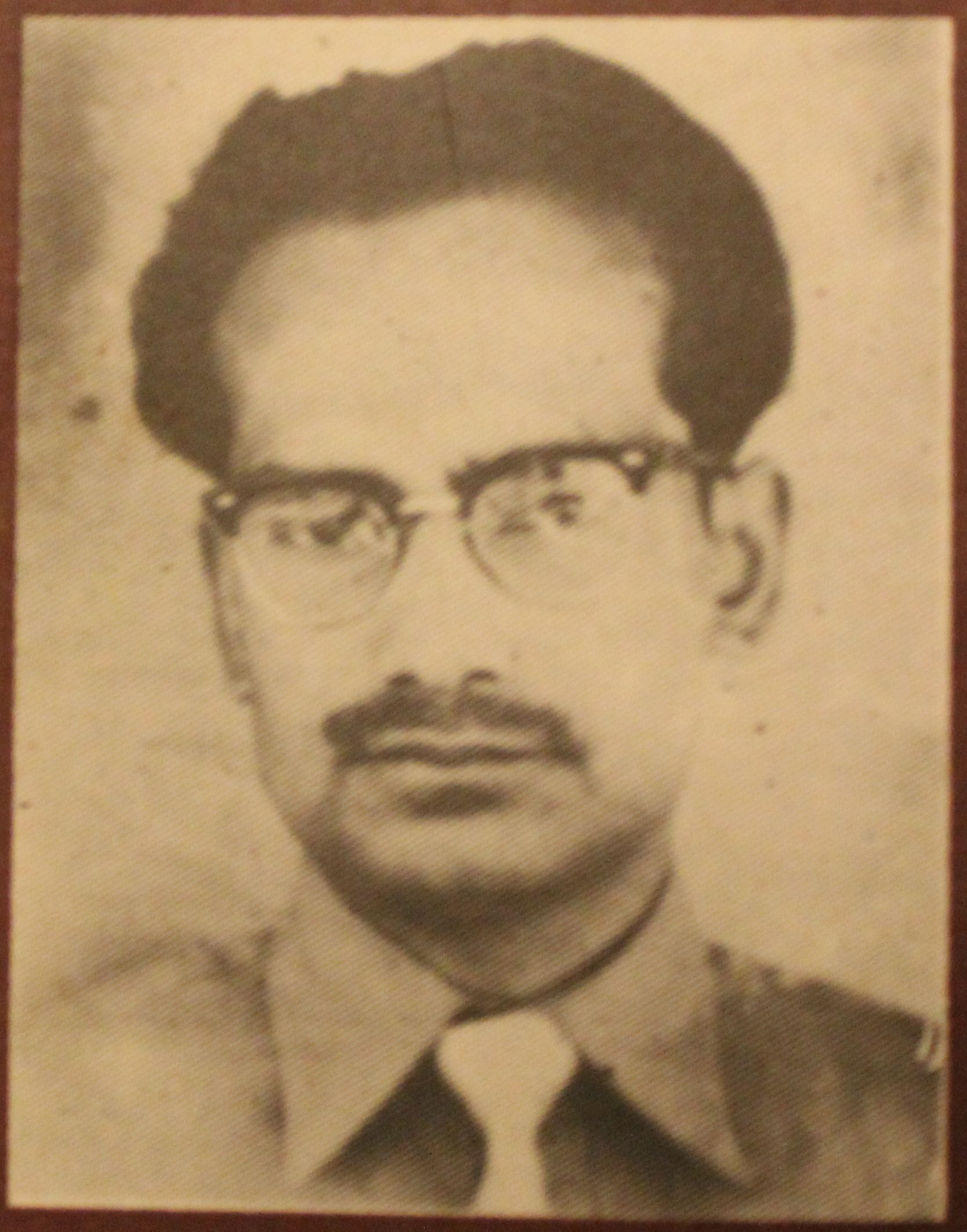
- Born: Rajkamal Choudhary; 13 December 1929; Mahishi, Saharsa, Bihar, India,
- Died: 19 June 1967 (aged 37); Mahishi, Bihar, India
- Resting place: Mahishi, Bihar, India
- Occupation: Writer
- Spouse(s): Shashikanta Choudhary, Savitri Sharma

Rajkamal Choudhary (13 December 1929 – 19 June 1967) (also spelled Rajkamal Chaudhary or Rajkamal Chaudhari) was an Indian poet, short story writer, novelist, critic and thinker in Maithili & Hindi languages. He was known as "a bold leader of new poetry" and writer who "stands out differently" from most other experimentalists.

== Biography ==
=== Early life ===
Raj Kamal was born in a Brahmin family at Rampur Haveli (a village near Muraliganj which was his mother's home) in northern Bihar. His real name was Manindra Narayan Choudhary. People used to affectionately call him Phool Babu. He was eldest son of Madhusudan Choudhary, a noted scholar of his time and a resident of Mahishi village. When Rajkamal was barely 10–12 years old, he suffered the loss of his mother, Triveni Devi, which left a deep imprint on his mind. He spent his childhood in Mahishi village of Saharsa district of northern Bihar. Later he moved to Jayanagar, Barh and Nawada along with his father and would come back to his village during summer vacations. His father Madhusudan Choudhary remarried, after death of Rajkamal's mother, with Jamuna Devi who was of similar age to Rajkamal. Arrival of step mother in his house was the beginning of a tumultuous relationship between Rajkamal and his father. Because his step mother was of similar age as Rajkamal was, he could never see her in same manner as he used to see his own mother or his earlier step mother ( Prior to Madhusudan Chaudhary's marriage to Rajkamal's mother, he had a previous marriage but did not have a child from that marriage). Being a "mother" to a man just a little younger than her, it must have been a difficult role for Jamuna Devi and a weird one too. For this marriage, Rajkamal never forgave his father.

Until passing matriculation, Rajkamal was religious. He could easily recite hymns from Geeta and Durga Saptshati. His father wanted him to be an obedient son and a Brahmin with values. To inculcate these values in Rajkamal, he would use- order, preaching and beating. While preaching, his father would give him an example of a son who got burnt alive on the deck of a ship while obeying the orders of his father. Rajkamal would find such examples ridiculous and loathsome.

=== Education ===
Rajkamal passed his matriculation examination in 1947 from Nawada high school in Bihar. After that he moved to Patna and got himself admitted to B.N. College Patna in Bihar in Intermediate (arts) program. He lived in B.N. College hostel where he got more inclined towards literature and started reading about painting and started drawing. He was quick to make friends with strangers. Girls would be easily attracted to him. This is where he met a girl named Shobhana and fell in love with her. Shobhna's father was transferred to Bhagalpur and as a result Shobhana moved away from Patna. To be with Shobhana, he left intermediate (arts) program at B. N. College and moved to Bhagalpur and got himself enrolled in Intermediate (commerce) program at Marwari College in Bhagalpur in 1948. For many distractions that came to Rajkamal at that time, he could not successfully complete his intermediate (commerce) program at Bhagalpur and got himself enorolled at Gaya College. He finished his Intermediate (commerce) and then Bachelors in (commerce) in 1954.

=== Career ===
Soon after graduating from college with a B.Com, there was an intense pressure on him to get settled as he was newly married (He married first time with Shashikanta Choudhary in 1951). Sometime in 1955, he started a government job at Patna secretariat in the education department. But he never considered job as his goal of life. The job was just to make his ends meet, not more than that.He was afraid that he might turn into how others live their life which he mentioned in one of his stories in Sarika- get a degree, start a job, become a servant, get pension and pass away.It is believed that he quit ( or was perhaps dismissed) from this job in 1957 because of being absent for long duration of times (as new events were happening in his life which included his second marriage to Savitri Sharma of Mussoorie). After that he worked as a journalist, writer, poet and translator during six years of stay in Calcutta and later part of his short life. Fighting bad health, money problems and intellectual clashes inside his own mind, he wrote until his death.

=== Personal life ===
Rajkamal came across many women at different phases in his life. His first love was Shobhana who he met at Patna and in fact abandoned his education at B.N. College Patna just to be with her in Bhagalpur. He married his first wife Shashikanta Chaudhary of Chanpura Darbhanga in 1951 at Saurath Sabaha where all nubile youths used to congregate. Rajkamal was not ready for this marriage and agreed only after lot of persuasion from the members of his family. In 1956 he married Savitri Sharma of Mussoorie, even then he maintained his marriage relationship with his first wife. Savitri came from an affluent family but the marriage did not last even a year. During this marriage, while he was in Mussoorie, he got attracted to another woman called Santosh, who was Savitri's niece.

== Literary contribution ==
After graduating in commerce, he dedicated himself to his creative pursuits. His creativity came in all flavours- as a poet, as a novelist, as a story writer, as a dramatist and as a journalist to name a few. This creativity spanned in mainly three languages-Maithili, Hindi and Bengali. Though, he also wrote some poems in English.

=== In Maithili ===
It is believed that he first started as a poet in Maithili. It is said that he was influenced by his teacher at Nawada high school who was fond of rhyming. This is where Rajkamal first felt that he could also write poetry. His first lines (which remained unpublished) were recorded on the first page of his high school notebook. Many don't believe it to be his first work due to the maturity of thoughts, hardly suggest it to be a rookie's work. His first lines were

चान सन सज्जित धरा पर

कय रहल प्रियतमा अभिनय
बूड़ि भोर मन टुभुकी उठले

अहीं सं हम करब परिणय

.

The very first story of Maithili Aprajita came in 1954 in Vaidehi. His first Maithili poem was published in Vaidehi titled Pataniya tattook prati in 1955. By the time he started publishing his work in Hindi regularly, he had already established as a writer of repute in Maithili in a very short span of time give to his farsighted, timeless work which vehemently attacked social taboos of Mithila (Maithili Language Speaking Area) deeply ingrained in its culture. During his lifetime, the first poetry collection that came (in the year 1958) was titled Swargandha. His next poetry collection came 14 years after his death and 23 years after publication of his first poetry collection in 1981. It was titled Kavita Rajkamalak edited my Mohan Bhardwaj.One of uniqueness of his style of poetry is that he did not follow any meter, any rhyme or any set structure in his poems. They were written in a moment and were mostly reflecting the way the life came to him. A majority of Rajkamal's work had some connection with his personal experiences. His way of looking at things clearly differentiated him from his contemporaries. One example can be seen in this poem-

Original Maithili Poem
जागल छी, कती राति बीतल अछि
ज्ञान नै होइए किछुओ
रूसल पिया जकां नहि कर मान-अभिमान
चान हे, आबह, लालटेनक बदला में
दान दैह किछु ज्योति
दुइए पांति लिखबा लेल आब अछि चिठ्ठी
अप्पन रानी के

Hindi Translation
जगा हूँ कितनी रात हुई कुछ पता नहीं.
चाँद! रूठी हुई पिया की तरह मान अभिमान मत करो
कुछ ज्योति दान दो
अपनी रानी को जो चिठी लिखा रहा हूँ
उसमे बस दो पंक्ति शेष है

English Translation
Am awake. Don't know how long this night has already been.
Don't sulk like my angry lover, oh moon!
Come gift me some light, for a lantern,
Just two lines remain
in this letter to my queen

In Maithili he wrote nearly 100 poems, three novels, 37 stories, three one act plays and four critical essays. The vast literature that he penned in a short 13 years of literary life, majority of his work remained unpublished till his death. Nearly ten months after his death, his friends at BIT Sindri brought the first collection of his Maithili short stories Lalka Paag. This was followed by Nirmohi Balam Hamar and Ek Anaar Ek Rogaah. In 1980 Maithili Academy published Kriti Rajkamalak which was followed by Ekta Champakali Ekta Vishdhar(edited by Taranand Viyogi) in the year 1983. The story Ekta Champakali Ekta Vishdhar attacks at the social problem of Mithila (Maithili Language Speaking Area) where women, even in today's times, are forcibly married to an unequal match. In this particular story, he shows how the mother (the Vishadhar) does not care to set up her young daughter's (the Champakali) marriage to an old man just to free herself up (due to her poor background which won't allow her pay the dowry which is another malady of that society).

=== In Hindi ===
Although Rajkamal wrote in Maithli for a longer duration than Hindi, he was able to write much more in Hindi . According to his wife Shashikanta Chaudhary, the time after 1960 was very suitable for his creative pursuits as he was living a more "settled" life. Sometimes he would get so involved in reading or writing that he won't go to bed until dawn.Some believe that writing in Hindi was more profitable therefore he concentrated more towards Hindi writing. He wrote eight novels, about 250 poems, 92 stories, 55 essays, three plays and five regular columns in Hindi.Rajkamal started to write in Hindi from 1956. The first poem that was published was titled Barsaat:Raat:Prabhaat. His work in Hindi was very different from Maithili in many ways. These differed in the setup, the problems enquired and the class addressed. One common thread to his Maithili and Hindi writings was women. Like in Maithili, he used women to portray the socio-economic problems of life. Most of his time of his creative Hindi writing was spent in Calcutta which has featured in many of his stories. Its really amazing that just by reading western life, he was very able to portray the life in New York as detailed in his novel Machhali Mari Hui. He expressed his "open" ideas in a time when India still was deeply rooted to its tradition. Subjects like Sex were not out of bedroom. A person's life was judged how "good" of man/woman he/she was as those who took sex as a biological outcome were not looked highly. In a way, such attempts were also a cover up of social maladies some believed that not discussing them would mean they do not exist. Rajkamal, believed that many of such problems have come because of atrocities that our very own society has made. For example a sixteen-year young women married to a sixty-two-year-old man will never have her sexual desires fulfilled. The society that she lives does not allow her to express her (her biological expressions) by keeping her in closed doors, by keeping her always under the nose of her husband and by branding her as prostitute even she mixes up freely with a member of an opposite sex. Therefore, she ends up in "illegitimate" relationship, "illegitimate" acts, incest but nobody looks at the root cause of these problems. Even in an urban setting, he saw pretty much the same thing but not the form of oppression but extreme freedom. The problems that richness brings. Machhali Mari Hui is considered as one of his finest novels in Hindi. He has described homosexual (lesbian) relations in this book which is probably the first Hindi work touching this subject and one of the earliest works in this area. A vast majority of his unpublished and published work in Hindi has been compiled and published by Deoshankar Navin who has worked tirelessly to bring the writings of Rajkamal Chaudhary in the book form to its readers over the years.

=== In Punjabi ===
Rajkamal Choudhary's stories were also translated in Punjabi language. Among the 23 awardees Balbir Madhopuri, a renowned Punjabi writer has received the Sahitya Akademy Award for Translation in 2013 for “Raj Kamal Chaudhary Dian Chonvian Khananiyan” (Selected Stories of Raj Kamal Chaudhary).

=== Other work ===
While in Calcutta (now Kolkata) he came in touch with the Hungryalists, known also as "Bhukhi Peerhi", and contributed to their bulletins. He was in close contact with Patna-based Malay Roy Choudhury, Subimal Basak and Samir Roychoudhury of the "Bhukhi Peerhi" movement.

== Published Literary Work ==
Maithili (Published books)

- Andolan (Novel)
- Adikatha (Novel)
- Pathar Phool (Novel)
- Lalka Paag (Collection of stories)
- Ek Anar Ek Rogaah (Collection of stories)
- Nirmohi Baalam Hamar (Collection of stories)
- Ekta Champakali Ekta Vishdhar (Collection of stories)
- Kriti Rajkamalak (Collection of stories)
- Swargandha (Collection of poems)
- Kavita Rajkamalak (Collection of poems)

Hindi (published books)

- Machhali Mari Hui (Novel)
- Dehgaatha (Novel)
- Nadi Behti Thi (Novel)
- Shahar Tha Shahar Nahi Tha ( Novel)
- Agnisnaan(Novel)
- Bees Raniyo Ke Biscope (Novel)
- Ek Anar Ek Beemar (Novel)
- Taash Ke Patton Ka Shahar (Novel)
- Samudrik Aur Anya Kahaniyaan (Collection of stories)
- Machhalijaal (Collection of stories)
- Pratinidhi Kahaaniyaan (Collection of stories)
- Kankawati (Collection of poems)
- Mukti Prasang (Collection of poems)
- Is Akalwela Me (Collection of poems)

Bengali (published books)

- Chaurangi (Translation)

हमरा दुःख जे
कविता हमार काँचे रहि गेल
एहेन जारैन से उठल कहाँ धधरा
व्यथा कहब ककरा
Its really painful
that my "poem" remained unfinished
A tinder that couldn't go aflame
who to tell my woes

राजकमल चौधरी (Rajkamal Chaudhary)
