= Subimal Mishra =

Indian Bengali novelist (1943–2023)

Subimal Misra
- সুবিমল মিশ্র
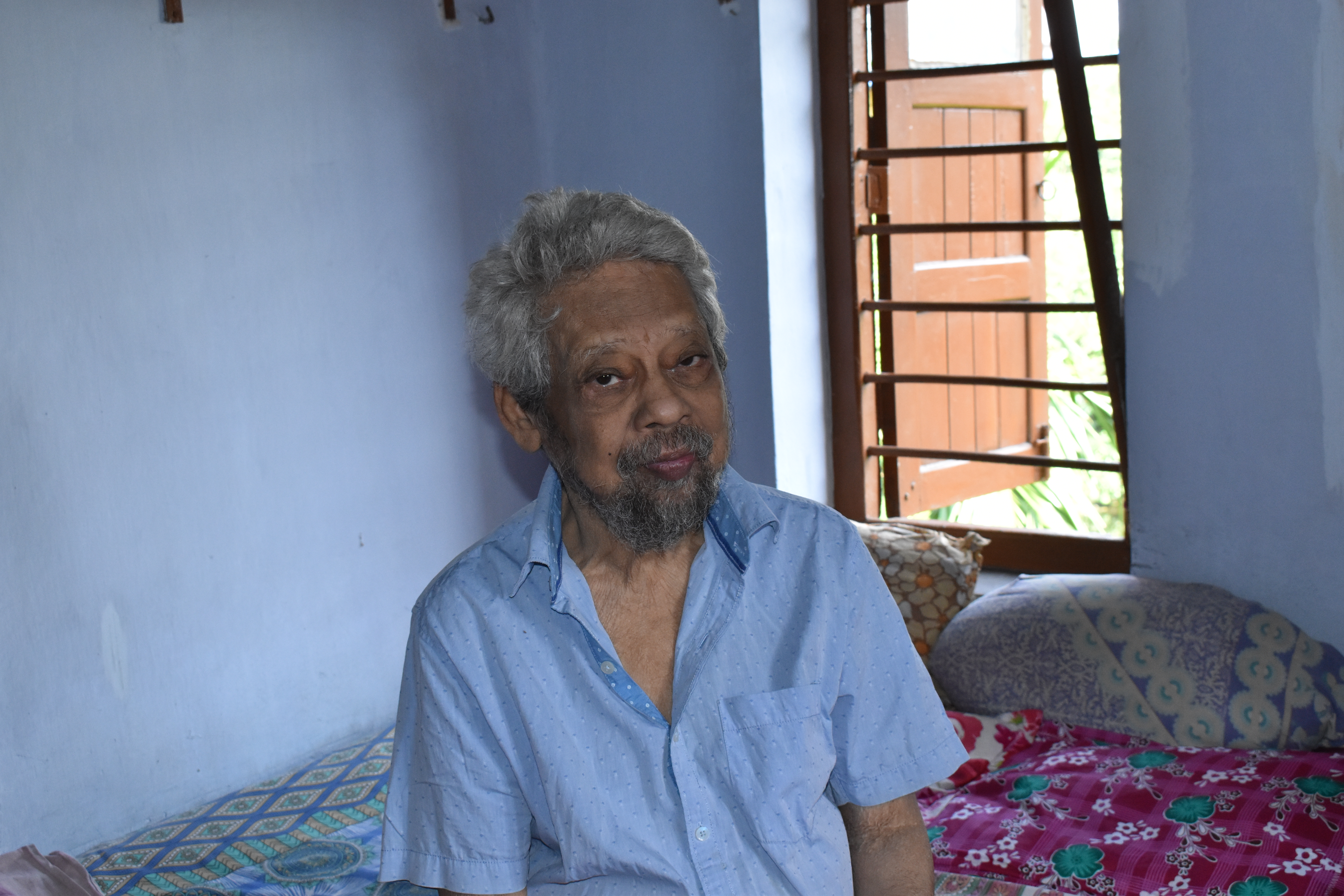
- Mishra in his home
- Born: 20 June 1943; British India
- Died: 8 February 2023 (aged 79); Kolkata, India
- Occupations: novelist, Short Story Writer and Essayist
- Writing career
- Notable work: The Corpse of Haaraan Maajhi's Widow or the Golden Statue of Gandhi
- Literary movement: Postmodernism, Anti-establishment and Little magazine

Subimal Misra (20 June 1943 – 8 February 2023) was an Indian Bengali novelist, short story writer, and essayist. He was known as a maverick and audacious experimentalist in contemporary Bengali literature. Many contemporary avant-garde writers have been influenced by Misra's experimental writing style. Misra is recognized having been a stalwart of the little magazine movement in West Bengal and championed its cause throughout his life.

Subimal Misra started his literary career at the end of 1967. From the start of his career, he wrote only for Bengali little magazines; he never contributed anything to any commercial magazines. His starkly political writings offer strong critiques of what he described as the complacent and decadent bourgeoisie.

Heavily influenced by Jean-Luc Godard, Subimal Misra uses various cinematic techniques, like montage, jump-cut etc., in his literary works. It is said that once he wrote to Godard, expressing his deep love for his works, along with a few samples of his writings, and Godard replied, mentioning him as 'Godard of literature'.

Misra lived in Shampa Mirza Nagar, Kolkata. He was suffering from serious heart disease and could not write due to ill health. Misra died on 8 February 2023, at the age of 79.

== Works ==
To date, Misra has published over 20 volumes of stories, novels, novellas, non-fictions and plays. Most of these volumes are conceptualized, designed, printed and published by the author himself.

=== Fictions ===
Misra's early works, published in various little magazines, instantly attracted the attention of readers and critics alike due to their sheer experimental forms and controversial subjects. One of his early short stories "Haaraan Maajhi-r Bidhabaa Bou-er Maraa baa Sonaa-r Gandhimurti" (The Corpse of Haaraan Maajhi's Widow or the Golden Statue of Gandhi), met with huge critical applause in its first appearance. After the publication of this story, Kamal Kumar Majumdar and Amiya Bhushan Majumdar, two stalwarts of alternative Bengali literature, congratulated and encouraged him to continue writing. After that, he took writing as a serious vocation. During this time, he wrote some of his most acclaimed stories—"Baganer Ghoraanim-er Gaachh-e Dekhonchacha Thaakten" (Uncle Seer Used to Live on the Ghoraanim Tree in the Grove), "Ut" (The Camel), "Chhuri" (The Dagger), "Porijaatok" (Descendant of an Angel) and "Nuye-Guye Dui Bhai" (Nuye and Guye are Two Brothers).

His later short stories include-- "Nangaa Haar Jege Uthchhe" (Naked Bones are Waking Up), "Calcutta Dateline", "Satitwa Ki Raakhbo Aparna?" (Aparna, Should I Keep My Virginity?), "Nikat Probishto Samporkeo Dharankshamotaa" (The Ability to Hold the Closely Penetrated One), "Mati Nore" (The Earth Trembles) and many more. Most of these stories are included in the collection "36 Bachhor-er Rograrogri" (Haggles of the Past 36 Years)

Subimal Misra used the words "anti-novel" and "anti-story" to differentiate his works from the traditional narrative fictions. His first anti-novel "Aasole Eti Ramayan Chamar-er Golpo Hoye Uthte Paarto" (It could have been Ramayan Chamar's Story), published in 1984, though centred on and around a fictitious character called Ramayan Chamar, is actually the story of creating a story, a metafiction. This novel, set against the tumultuous political scenario of West Bengal in the 70's, strongly attacks the aimlessness of today's political thoughts and their bigotry.

Mishra wrote two other "Anti-Novels" in this period-- "Rang Jakhon Satarkikaron-er Chihno" (When Colour is the Symbol of Danger), published in 1984 and "Kantha Palak Ora-- Sabkichhui" (The Featherd Neck—Everything), published in 1990. These two, along with "Ramayan Chamar" constitute a trilogy which explores the inevitable decadence of urban middle-class.

His later anti-novels are more cryptic and chaotic in nature. These works include-- "Satya Utpaadito Hay" (Truth Gets Manufactured), "One Pice Father Mother" (A Penny is my Father and Mother), and "Chete-Chushe-Chibiye-Giley" (Lick-Suck-Munch-Gulp).

Mishra published two books in their manuscript form, reproduced by photocopying -- "Harmormori" (Clatter of Bones) and "Pnod-er Gu Tin Jaygaa-y Laage" (Shitty Bum Touches in Three Places). These two books employ extensive graphical and visual elements in their structures. Language and image are inextricably intermingled here to produce an archetypal and tortuous view of our existence.

Mishra also wrote a play-- "Vito Pnatha-r Istoo" (Stew of Brother Billy Goat).

=== Non-fictions ===
Though it is often difficult to demarcate between fiction and non-fiction in Subimal Misra's works, he has published two complete volumes of non-fictions in which he has elaborated on his ideology and stance as a writer. One of these two volumes, "Sun and Murderer", is a collage of his own essays, letters, medical reports and entries from his journal as well as other people's comments on his writings, criticisms and book-reviews. The other collection is titled as "Subimal-er Biruddhe Subimal" (Subimal Against Subimal) which highlights not only his commitment as an anti-establishment writer, but also the contradiction inherent in it. In Bengali literature the writers who are considered to be of the same anti-establishment school are the Hungryalists such as Basudeb Dasgupta, Subhas Ghosh, Malay Roy Choudhury, and Arunesh Ghosh.In fact, the Hungryalists were the first post-colonial generation to vent their anti-establishment voice of libertad in pre-planned narratives. Though Subimal Misra was never a part of the Hungryalist Movement, there are some common elements (like, anti-establishment and anti-narrative stance) of Hungryalism visible in his works as well.

== Themes, styles, techniques and influence ==
=== Themes ===
Misra's works are essentially anti-establishment and blasphemous in nature. He questions and thereby disturbs our complacence as readers. According to him, his works remain incomplete without the active participation of his readers. Starting from the titles of his books, he tries to destroy all the traditional and preconceived notions about art and literature. To disavow the concept of establishment and consumerism in art, he himself publishes and distributes his own books.

Along with politics, Sex is an important and recurring subject in Misra's works. Throughout his writings, he tries to reveal the matriarchal past of human society by deconstructing the chauvinistic elements, various forms of sexual dominance and discriminations. Sex, according to him, is a weapon in this consumerist society, at once repressed and liberated. He uses the form of pornography, stressing the subversive aspects of it, to explore the socio-political forces behind the concepts of sex and sexuality in modern society.

=== Styles ===
Rather than adopting a narrative approach, his more recent works draw on newspaper clippings, essays, and excerpts from his journal and letters. According to Subimal Misra, this form is essentially important in today's world because of its inherent ‘plurality’. It opens up a discursive field within the readers’ minds—at once contradictory and concurrent. "One Pice Father Mother" (A Penny is my Father and Mother), and "Chete-Chushe-Chibiye-Giley" (Lick-Suck-Munch-Gulp) are good examples of his extremely anti-narrative stance.

=== Use of visual elements in writing ===
Apart from collage (or, Montage, borrowing the term from film) and cut-ups as writing techniques, Subimal Misra amply uses calligraphy, innovative letterings and graphics in his writings. Such evocative usage of visuals is a means of provoking and stimulating the readers, and creating new meanings out of those mundane words. Often, in Misra's works, two or more paragraphs are merged, thereby creating two separate texts running parallel to and colliding with each other.

=== Influence ===
To some extent, Subimal Misra's works resemble those of William S. Burroughs. Like Burroughs, Misra also uses a technique similar to cut-up. At the same time, he acknowledges the influence of James Joyce, Jean-Paul Sartre, Kathy Acker, Samuel Beckett and even, Kurt Vonnegut on his works. He is also influenced by various filmmakers and their works, most notably, Jean-Luc Godard, Andrei Tarkovsky, Luis Buñuel and Ritwik Ghatak.

== Selected bibliography ==
- Haaraan Maajhi'r Bidhabaa Bou-er Maraa baa Sonaa'r Gandhimurti (The Corpse of Haaraan Maajhi's Widow or the Golden Statue of Gandhi : An Anthology of Short Stories), 1971
- Nangaa Haar jege Uthchhe (Naked Bones are Waking Up), 1974
- Aasole Eti Ramayan Chamar-er Golpo Hoye Uthte Paarto (It could have been Ramayan Chamar's Story), 1982
- Rang Jakhan Satarkikaran-er Chihno (When Colour is the Symbol of Danger), 1984
- Shreshtha Golpo (Selected Stories), 1989
- Kantha Palak Ora—Sabkichhui (The Feathered Neck—Everything), 1990
- Ei Amader Siki-Lebu Ningraani (This is How We Rinse a Quarter of a Lemon), 1990
- Sun and Murderer, 1996
- Subimal-er Biruddhe Subimal (Subimal Against Subimal),
- Anti-Golpo Sangraha (Collected Anti-Stories), 1998
- Anti-Uponyas Sangraha (Collected Anti-Novels), 1999
- One Pice Father Mother (A Penny is My Father and Mother), 2000
- Tamaak-er Bazaar Bonaam Euclid-er Chatushparsha (The Tobacco Market Vs. Euclid's Surroundings), 2002
- Chete-Chushe-Chibiye-Giley (Lick-Suck-Munch-Gulp), 2003
- 36 Bachhor-er Rograrogri (Haggles of the Past 36 Years), 2004
- Kika Cut-Out, 2006
- Pnod-er Gu Tin Jaygaa-y Laage (Shitty Bum Touches in Three Places), 2006–2007
- Misra, S. (2012). The Golden Gandhi Statue from America. India: HarperCollins Publishers India.

== See also ==
- Avant-garde
- Jean-Luc Godard
- Sandipan Chattopadhyay
- Kamal Kumar Majumdar
- Amiya Bhushan Majumdar
- Manik Bandyopadhyay
- Raymond Federman
