= Debi Roy =

Indian Bengali poet and one of the founders of Hungry Gentation Movement (Born: 1940)

Debi Roy (born 4 August 1940) is one of the founding fathers of the Hungry generation movement in Bengali literature. He is also the first modern Dalit poet in Bengali. He was born in a very poor family and worked as an errand boy in tea stalls of Calcutta when his parents lived in a slum in Howrah. He funded his own education and became a graduate of Calcutta University. He started writing in his childhood. Debi Roy met Malay Roy Choudhury in an office of a literary periodical in 1960 and the two of them, after discussions with Shakti Chattopadhyay and Samir Roychoudhury launched the now famous Hungryalist movement in November 1961. His Howrah slum-room was the editorial office from where the Hungryalist Bulletins and Hungryalist Manifestoes were published. Along with ten other Hungryalists, Debi Roy was arrested in 1964 on charges of obscenity in poetry, though the trial court exonerated him.

He developed new kinds of sentences in his poems which have come to be known as logical breaks as well as image jumping. Subsequent Bengali poets have followed the method into the next century. As a result, he is considered one of the first postmodern Bengali poets.

== Poetry collections by Debi Roy ==
- Unmad Shahar
- Kolkata O Aami
- Manush Manush
- Sampratik Tinjan
- Debi Royer Kobita
- Bhrukutir Birudhdhey Eka
- Ei Sei Tomar Desh
- Putulnaacher Gaan
- Sarbohara Tabu Ahankar
- Bharatvarsha Tomay Khunjchhey
- Aaguner Gaan
- Ekushey February
- Nirbachito Kobita
