= Titli (2002 film) =

- DVD film poster
- Directed by: Rituparno Ghosh
- Produced by: Sutapa Ghosh; Tapan Biswas
- Starring: Mithun Chakraborty; Aparna Sen; Konkona Sen Sharma
- Cinematography: Avik Mukhopadhyay
- Distributed by: Cinemawalla
- Release date: 2002
- Running time: 103 minutes
- Language: Bengali

Titli (lit. 'butterfly') is a 2002 Indian Bengali-language film by Rituparno Ghosh, starring Konkona Sen Sharma, Aparna Sen, and Mithun Chakraborty who plays a fictional version of himself. The film tells the story of a developing adolescent, played by Konkona, and the sensitivity of a teenager, and also the portrayal of the mother-daughter relationship and quiet understanding within the pair.

== Plot ==
The story develops around the evolution of Titli from a girl into womanhood, through the breaking of this crush. The dense jungles of Duars in North Bengal, covered in dense morning fog, sunshine playing hide-and-seek, Buddhist monasteries, the famous Darjeeling toy train, interleaved with poetry and music, create the romantic ambiance underpinning this film.

Titli is a 17-year-old girl (Konkona Sen Sharma), who has a teenage crush on a Bollywood superstar Rohit Roy (Mithun Chakraborty), who is more than twice her age. Though her bedroom is filled with his posters and memorabilia, Titli's mother, Urmila (Aparna Sen), is surprised to learn that she could even marry this much older man.

Titli and Urmila are going by jeep to receive Titli's father (Dipankar De) from the airport. Along the scenic road from Kurseong to Siliguri, Urmila shares a nostalgic moment when she is reminded about her teenage crush on Rajesh Khanna after hearing Titli play the song "Meri Sapnon Ki Raani". The jeep is to be shared, and as it happens, their co-passenger is none other than Rohit Roy himself, who has a flight to catch from Siliguri. Titli's adolescent dreams are set on fire after she meets her crush face-to-face. Their conversation is interrupted by a halt necessitated by the coolant running out. Rohit also needs cigarettes, and Titli wants to get them and gets Rohit to agree. While she is gone, it is revealed that twenty years ago, Urmila and Rohit were lovers when Rohit was an outsider looking for roles in the Tollygunge film industry. Today, Urmila is married, but the lingering romance is built up by the hill greenery, and they both reminisce longingly. Urmila recites lines from the well-known Shakti Chattopadhyay poem Abani Bari Aachho? (Abani, are you home?).

One of the themes of the film is "the first day of the rains". Urmila wonders if it is the first day of Aasharh - the month heralding the monsoons in the Bengali calendar, a month rendered romantic in Kalidasa’s epic verse, Meghadutam. Rohit feels a droplet of rain on his watch. The foggy romantic mood heightens as Urmila sings a Rabindrasangeet and recites a Tagore poem. By now, unbeknownst to the old lovers, Titli has returned, and she overhears the conversation and learns of their relationship. Her own romance is shattered, and John Lennon’s "Strawberry Fields Forever" builds up the mood of desolation. Soon they reach the airport where they meet Titli's father, an avid reader of Harry Potter novels and a book of jokes by Khushwant Singh (a sign of his open-minded mentality). Unknown to the fact that Rohit was the former lover of his wife, he becomes overjoyed after meeting him and also encourages his wife and daughter to keep in contact with Rohit. On the way home, Titli is on the verge of tears as she grapples with the fact that her own mother has become her immediate rival. She has always been very close to her mother, and the tension mounts as she does not know how to deal with this pain. Eventually, Titli cannot suppress her curiosity about whether her mother still loves Rohit. In the end, when Rohit writes a letter to Urmila about his engagement to another woman, she gets her answer.

The film is very stylishly made, even the end story coinciding with the announcement on a magazine cover - "Bangali Babur Biye" (Bengali gentleman gets married).

== Cast ==
- Mithun Chakraborty as Rana "Rohit" Roy, a fictional version of himself
- Aparna Sen as Urmila Chatterjee
- Konkona Sen Sharma as Tilottama "Titli" Chatterjee
- Deepankar De as Urmila's husband
