= Phire Esho, Chaka =

Bengali poetry book

- Book cover of Phire Esho, Chaka
- Author: Binoy Majumdar
- Original title: ফিরে এসো চাকা
- Language: Bengali
- Genre: Poetry
- Publication date: 1962
- Publication place: India

Phire Esho, Chaka (lit. Come back, O wheel) is a Bengali poetry book written by Binoy Majumdar. The book was published in 1961 and then republished in 1962 under the title Phire Esho, Chaka. The book was initially published as Gayatrike (lit. To Gayatri). This book is a collection of romantic poems written for Majumdar's contemporary Gayatri Chakravorty Spivak.

The book is also dedicated to Gayatri Chakravorty. The word "Chaka" which means "Chakra" is Sanskrit, was a part of Gayatri Chakravorty's surname. This book is considered as the most famous book of Majumdar. The book was written in format of a diary. Majumdar used dates as poem titles such as, 8 March 1960, 27 June 1961, 1 July 1961 etc.

== See also ==
- Binoy Majumdar
- Hungry generation
