= Utpal Kumar Basu =

Indian Bengali-language poet and storyteller (1939-2015)

- উৎপল কুমার বসু
- Born: 3 August 1939; Bhawanipore, Calcutta, Bengal Presidency, British India
- Died: 3 October 2015 (aged 76); Kolkata, West Bengal, India
- Education: Scottish Church College
- Occupations: Poet, Writer, Story teller
- Movement: Hungry movement, Krittibas

Utpal Kumar Basu (উৎপল কুমার বসু) (3 August 1939 – 3 October 2015) was a Bengali vernacular poet, educationist, translator, and storyteller.

== Life ==
Born in the Bhowanipore area of pre-independence Kolkata in 1937 and completed school education in Baharampur (Murshidabad, West Bengal) and Dinhata (Coochbehar, North Bengal). A geologist by education, Basu has travelled far and wide over the seas and years. An educationist by profession, Basu is recognized as a trendsetter in modern Bengali Poetry. He began writing while studying at Scottish Church College and became a part of the Krittibash group of young Bengali poets. From his first collection of poems entitled Chaitre Rochito Kobita (1956), he found a unique diction of language, expression, and form for his poetry.

Basu chose mysticism over sentimentalism, and vivid objective observation over lyricism. After receiving his master's degree in geology from Presidency College, he joined Ashutosh College as a lecturer and met his future wife, Santana, a lecturer in the English Department. Santana had been awarded the Indira Sinha Gold Medal for securing the highest aggregate of marks among female students in the BA examination at the Bihar University in 1955. Basu moved to England in the mid-sixties and spent a decade there as an educationist and associated himself with several socialist organisations. He returned to India in the late seventies and worked as a project officer for the University Grants Commission, and later as an advisor and teacher at St Xavier's College for Mass Communication. He died on 3 October 2015 in Kolkata.

== Critique ==
Basu started his literary journey in Kolkata in the 1950s. He chose mysticism over sentimentalism, and vivid objective observation over lyricism. He is known for his witty but meticulous approach to nature, objects, and life, which may resemble that of a scientist. The second and third collections of poems by Basu, namely Puri Series (1964) and Abar Puri Series (1978), added a new diction to Bengali literature. These works are popularly referred to as Famous Travel Poetry of Utpal. The uniqueness of the form and content of these poems has had a considerable impact on modern Bengali poetry. Basu kept experimenting with poetic forms and language. According to him, "The evolution of form has to be rapid and continuous, whereas the concept evolves slowly, maybe once in a century (ধূসর আতাগাছ )."

Basu met the American poet Allen Ginsberg in Kolkata in the early sixties and shared a great friendship with him. He connected with the Hungry Generation literary movement in the 60s and was compelled to resign from his job as a lecturer in a Kolkata college. He travelled far and wide, and spent years in Europe doing part-time jobs to survive. In England, he associated himself with various socialist organisations. His poetry had to pause temporarily, only to find a new form of his famous "travel poems", and he published a number of small, unassuming collections of poems with the lesser-known Little Magazine publishing house. He also wrote regularly on various subjects for popular Bengali dailies, including Aajkaal and Anandabazar Patrika.

He spent nearly fourteen years in London from 1964 to 1977 and returned to Kolkata and joined Chitrabani, an organisation closely linked to the University Grants Commission and St. Xavier's College, Kolkata. He was engaged in planning programmes and also conducting Mass Communication classes. He also translated works of such eminent writers as Ayappa Pannikar and Kamala Das, and edited a translation of a collection of Mizo poems and songs for the Sahitya Akademi.

Translations of his poems have been published regularly in the London Magazine. Basu died on 3 October 2015 in Kolkata following a prolonged illness. He was survived by son, Firoze, an assistant professor of English in the Department of Humanities at the MCKV Institute of Engineering in Howrah. Santana, after long teaching stints in Spastic Society of Eastern India and St. Augustine's Day School in Kolkata, died in November 2018 following a brief illness. Utpal continues to be an inspiration for little magazine publishers and young poets of Bengal.

Basu received the Ananda Puraskar by the ABP Group in 2006, and the Rabindra Puraskar by the Paschimbanga Bangla Academy in 2011, both for his collection of poems Sukh Dukhser Sathi. In 2014, he received the Sahitya Academy Award for his collection of poems entitled Piya Mana Bhabe. He was awarded the Sahitya Akademi Translation Prize 2018 for his translation into Bengali of Kamala Das's collection of poems titled Only the Soul Knows How to Sing (published posthumously).

== Bibliography ==
- Chaitrye Rochito Kobita (চৈত্রে রচিত কবিতা) [1956]
- Puri Series (পুরী সিরিজ) [1964]
- Narokhadok, collection of short stories (নরখাদক) [1970]
- Abar Puri Series (আবার পুরী সিরিজ) [1978]
- Lochondas Karigar(লোচনদাস কারিগর) [1982]
- Khandobaichitrer Din (খন্ডবৈচিত্র্যের দিন) [1986]
- Srestho kobita (শ্রেষ্ট কবিতা) [1991]
- Dhusar Atagach, collection of free prose (ধূসর আতাগাছ) [1994]
- Salma Jorir Kaaj (সলমা জরির কাজ) [1995]
- Kahabotir Nach (কহবতীর নাচ) [1996]
- Night School (নাইটস্কুল) [1998]
- Tusu Amar Chintamoni (তুসু আমার চিন্তামনি)
- Meenyuddha (মীনযুদ্ধ)
- Bokshigunje Padmapare (বক্সিগঞ্জে পদ্মাপাড়ে)
- Annadata Joseph (অন্নদাতা জোসেফ)
- Sukh Duhkher sathi (সুখদুঃখের সাথী)
- Translation from Safo [সাফোর কবিতা (অনুবাদ)]
- Collected poems (কবিতা সংগ্রহ)
- Collected prose (গদ্যসংগ্রহ)
- Bela Egarotar Rod
- Baba Bhoy Korche (বাবা ভয় করছে)
- Piya Mana Bhabe (poetry) [Won Sahitya Akademi Award, 2014]
- Hanscholar Path-Poetry, Long interview, Sketches (January-2015)
- Sadabrahmoman-collection of short stories, sketches and criticism-2015
- Tokyo Laundry-collection of short stories, sketches and criticism-2016
- Dear Sm-collection of personal letters written to wife Santana Basu-2016
- Collected poems -2 (কবিতা সংগ্রহ)-2017
- Saratsar-1-Poems and Prose -2017
- Dhritiman Sen er Diary Prose Saptarshi Prakashan 2021
- Lokomata Debi'r Kuwotola-Humorous critical sketches of programs aired on Kolkata Doordarshan in the 1990s under a pen -name- Deys Publishing 2022
- Kothay Kothay - collection of interviews of Bengal's Cultural icons 1950s - 1970s, Deys Publishing 2024
