= Basudeb Dasgupta =

Indian writer (1938–2005)

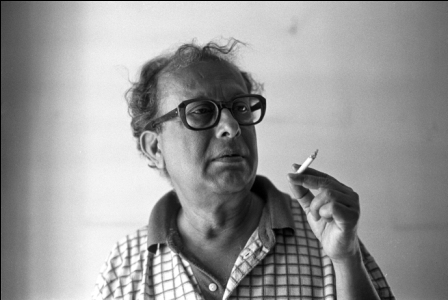
- Basudeb Dasgupta in Ashoknagar
- Born: 31 December 1938
- Died: 31 August 2005 (aged 66)
- Occupations: Novelist, short story writer and school-teacher
- Spouse: Indira Dasgupta
- Children: Amritakana Majumdar
- Writing career
- Literary movement: Hungry generation

Basudeb Dasgupta (31 December 1938 – 31 August 2005) was an Indian novelist and short-story writer associated with the Hungry generation movement in Bengali literature. He is considered one of the most significant avant-garde and controversial figures in the history of Bengali literature.

== Early life and education ==
His family came to India as refugees following the partition of Bengal in 1947. He graduated with an honours in Bengali literature from the Scottish Church College in 1961, which he followed with a degree in education. Between 1965 and till his retirement in 1999, he taught in a school.

== Writings ==
Basudeb's major contribution to Bengali literature spanned from the early 1960s to the mid-1980s. His distinct styled short stories of that span include Randhanshala (1963), Ratanpur (1964), Basantoutsav (1964), Riputarito (1965), Bamanrahasya (1965), Abhiramer Chalaphera (1967), Leni Bruce O Gopal Bhandke (1968), Debotader Koyekminit (1971), Dr. Wanger Gopan Sanket (1972), Baba (1975) and Durbin (1983).

His only collection of short stories, Randhanshala, was first published in 1965. It is considered a Hungry-classic and reprinted in 1983.

Basudeb Dasgupta published his first novel titled Utpat in 1962 in Upadruto journal and the second one Kheladhula (probably the most significant one) in 1981 in Dandashuk journal.

Thereafter Basudeb wrote a few short stories such as Bondi Bastabata (1986), Mrityuguha Thekey (in two installments in 1986 and 1987), Shesh Praharer Abhijan (1987), Eso (1990) and Mouno Nagarir Itikatha (in two installments in 1995 and 1996), but he had lost the previous magical charm of his prose style and imaginative fictional world.

== Books ==
- Randhanshala (Short story, 1965)
- Break Your Silence Please (Conversations, letters, diary entries, stray proses, 2006, Monfakira)
- Kheladhula (Novel, 2007, Monfakira)
- Lenny Bruce O Gopal Vand Ke (Short story, 2009, Open Secret)

== See also ==
- Shakti Chattopadhyay
- Binoy Majumdar
- Sandipan Chattopadhyay
- Samir Roychoudhury
- Subimal Basak
- Malay Roy Choudhury
- Tridib Mitra
- Falguni Roy
- Hungryalism
- Anil Karanjai
