= Anil Karanjai =

Indian artist (1940–2001)

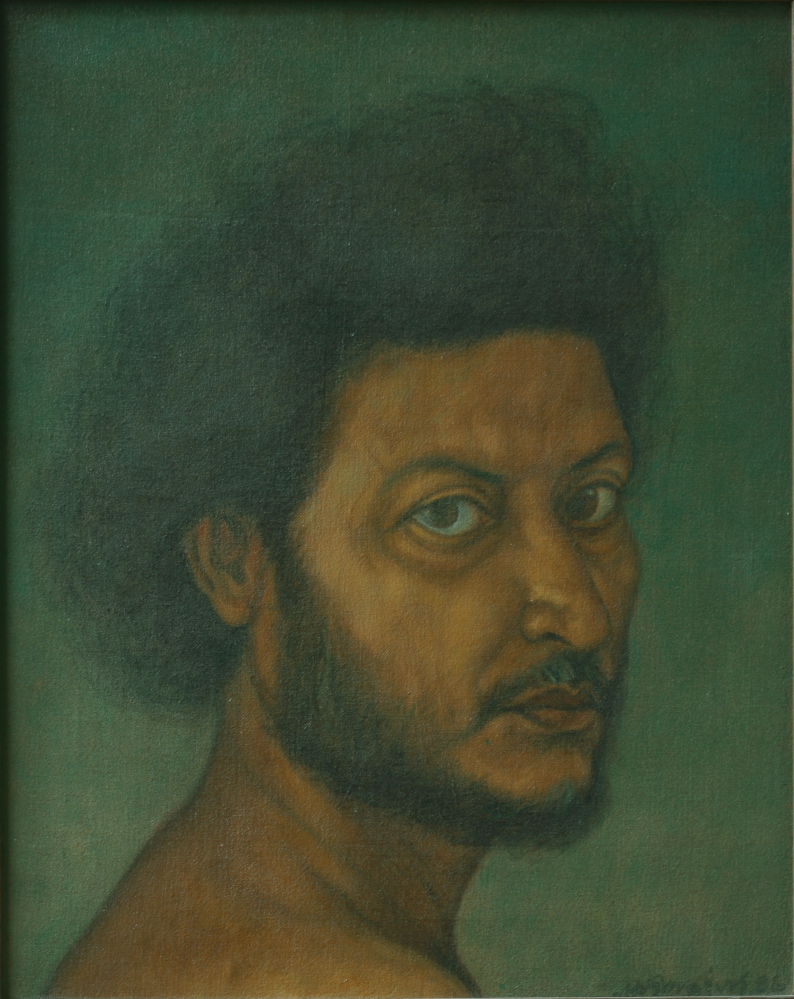
Self Portrait, 1985

Anil Karanjai (27 June 1940 – 18 March 2001) was an accomplished Indian artist. Born in East Bengal, he was educated in Benaras, where his family settled subsequent to the Partition of the Indian subcontinent in 1947. As a small child he had spent long hours playing with clay to make toys and arrows. He also began very early to draw animals and plants, or whatever inspired him. In 1956 he dropped out of school to become a full-time student at Bharatiya Kala Kendra, headed by Karnaman Singh, a master of the Bengal school and a Nepali by origin. This teacher encouraged Anil to experiment widely and to study the art of every culture. Anil remained here until 1960, exhibiting regularly and teaching other students. During the same period, he practised miniature painting at Bharat Kala Bhavan (Benaras Hindu University) under the eye of the last court painter to the Maharaja of Benaras. He also enrolled at Benaras Polytechnic to learn clay modelling and metal casting.

== The revolutionary 1960s ==
Throughout the revolutionary 1960s, Anil was at the forefront of the Indian and international politico-cultural movement. In 1962, with Karunanidhan Mukhopadhyay, he co-founded United Artists. Their studio, named Devil's Workshop, attracted artists, writers, poets and musicians from across India and abroad. The group established the first art gallery of Benaras in a rundown teashop, Paradise Cafe, frequented by some of this vibrant city's most colourful characters. Anil and others of the group also at this time lived in a commune and exchanged ideas and experiences with "seekers" from many countries.

Anil Karanjai was a very active member of the renowned Bengali radical group, Hungry Generation, otherwise known as the Hungryalism হাংরি আন্দোলন movement, composed in the main of writers and poets; Anil and Karunanidhan were the chief Hungryalism artists. Anil became friends with the Beat Generation's famous poet Allen Ginsberg and his partner Peter Orlovsky during their sojourn in India. The Hungryalists were based in Patna, Calcutta and Benaras and they also forged important contacts with the avant garde in Nepal. Anil created numerous drawings for Hungryalist publications. He also contributed posters and poems. In 1969, he moved to New Delhi where he organised and participated in various exhibitions including one at the Little Magazine Exhibition organised by Delhi Shilpi Chakra.

== Anil Karanjai's art and world view ==
In the early 1970s, Anil Karanjai made a huge impact in Indian art circles with his technical maturity and his dreamlike, often nightmarish, angry imagery. In many of his early paintings, contorted human forms emerge from weird landscapes to threaten and accuse; natural forms – rocks, clouds, animals and trees – become a vehicle for mass consciousness, waiting to release its energy against centuries of oppression. After his move to Delhi, his grotesque human forms were often integrated with ruins, a metaphor for the tyranny of history. An element of satirical humour is not, however, absent from most of these canvases. Moreover, Anil's imagery sometimes communicates a poetic romanticism, almost soft in expression. This would become much more pronounced in many of his later works in which landscape would become the predominant motif and in which the human presence is subtly suggested, often by a pathway or steps leading to a mysterious destination. Ghostly whispers also echo in his landscapes through old walls, gateways or sculpted pillars.

In 1972 he won a National Award, but this was to have little impact on his life. He was the quintessentially anti-establishment artist and he would remain so for the rest of his life. The intense collective spirit and accomplishments of the 1960s had made a huge mark on Anil. Thereafter he often felt creatively isolated. As a politico-cultural activist he would always remain committed, and he would maintain a relationship with the leading (হাংরি আন্দোলন) Hungry generation writers, Malay Roy Choudhury, Subimal Basak, Samir Roychoudhury, Tridib Mitra and others of that era. But as an artist he found himself increasingly at odds with his contemporaries. As time progressed, he tended more and more towards modes of expression considered unfashionable by the art establishment and by the new rich art collectors that emerged as India became a global economy. This is particularly true of his final decade when pure landscape became his principal vehicle of communication. Yet even in his lonely landscapes people are never far away. Indeed, his trees and other natural elements are animated by strangely human gestures. Sometimes the whole of nature seems to be conspiring against a hidden enemy, reflecting Anil's deep concerns as an environmental activist.

But it was not merely his subject matter that earned him neglect and even opprobrium among the powerful groups that decide upon the worldly success or failure of artists. At play too was the realism that characterises his late works. On the surface these may appear almost classical, yet for those many who appreciate them, they are expressions of a heightened realism that resonates throughout our contemporary age. Anil himself equated his work with a "magical realism". As he said in a film on him, The Nature of Art: “My paintings are a dream, a dream of nature.” The emotional content of the paintings was of supreme importance. In this, Anil drew from his immense knowledge of Indian classical music, particularly with regard to the raga, whereby a composition conveys the mood or feeling of a particular season or time. In art, its equivalent is called rasa, literally sap or essence, an aesthetic approach that Anil understood to be timeless and universal and which he sought to interpret in his paintings.

In his mature phase, Anil's philosophy of art had undergone a major metamorphosis. Whereas his early work could be described ideologically as confrontational, his late work was conceived and executed to give solace to the spectator. He came to see himself as a skilled professional, akin to a doctor. As he asserted on many occasions, including in the same film: “The role of today’s artist is to heal the wounds inflicted by our society.”

Throughout his career, Anil had worked in a variety of media, particularly in oils which he revered highly. But in the final years he completed many fine works in pastel crayons, above all dry pastel. This is a medium in which he showed greater mastery and inventiveness than probably any other Indian artist of his time. In his final decades, Anil also became a prolific portraitist. He carried out a number of commissioned portraits as a means of survival, but most of his best works in this genre are those of people close to him. Following the tradition of masters of the past, he produced a number of self-portraits. A few of these are among his most intensely expressive works.

== See also ==
- Malay Roy Choudhury
- Samir Roychoudhury
- Subimal Basak
- Tridib Mitra
- Basudeb Dasgupta
- Allen Ginsberg
- Hungry generation
- Shakti Chattopadhyay
