= Krittibas (magazine) =

Bengali poetry magazine

Krittibas is a Bengali poetry magazine that first appeared in Kolkata in 1953. It played a highly influential role in the Kolkata literary scene in the decades after Indian independence and provided a platform for young, experimental poets, many of whom went on to become luminaries of modern Bengali poetry.

== History ==
The editors of the inaugural issue in July 1953 were Sunil Gangopadhyay, Ananda Bagchi and Dipak Mazumdar. Gangopadhyay later became sole editor, and indeed it is his name that is most closely associated with the magazine. Others who also edited the magazine at one point or another included Shakti Chattopadhyay, Sarat Kumar Mukhopadhyay and Samarendra Sengupta. The Phanishwarnath Renu issue of the magazine was edited by Samir Roychoudhury. During 1961-65 several poets left the magazine and joined the Hungryalist Movement. Poets associated with the later run of the magazine include Prabal Kumar Basu.

Originally published as a quarterly, Krittibas became a monthly magazine in 1974. Besides promoting Bengali poetry, always its main focus, it also featured articles on various aspects of contemporary arts and culture.

In its early decades, Krittibas had a strong anti-establishment flavour to it. (In 1963, the Hungryalists were hauled into court on charges of obscenity; the Editor of the magazine, as defense witness for Malay Roy Choudhury responded by reading out the controversial poem Stark Electric Jesus in the courtroom!) But with the accretion of time and prestige, this trend waned and Krittibas itself became part of the cultural establishment.

Publication ceased altogether in 1982, and the magazine disappeared from the scene for many years. Then in 1999, Krittibas was reborn, this time as an annual magazine. Soon it became a bi-annual journal, and then turned into a quarterly again. Those Kolkatans who have been instrumental in the revival of the magazine are Bhaskar Dutta, Pradip Chandra Basu and Ashik Kumar Dasgupta.

In 2003, Krittibas celebrated its 50th anniversary with great fanfare. In 2013, another function was held at the Indian National Museum to celebrate its 60th anniversary.

== See also ==
- List of underground newspapers of the 1960s counterculture
