= Hungry generation =

1960s literary movement in the Bengali language

The Hungry Generation (Bengali: ক্ষুধার্ত প্রজন্ম) was a literary movement in the Bengali language launched by what is known today as the Hungryalist quartet, i.e. Shakti Chattopadhyay, Malay Roy Choudhury, Samir Roychoudhury and Debi Roy (alias Haradhon Dhara), during the 1960s in Kolkata, India. Due to their involvement in this avant garde cultural movement, the leaders lost their jobs and were jailed by the incumbent government. They challenged contemporary ideas about literature and contributed significantly to the evolution of the language and idiom used by contemporaneous artists to express their feelings in literature and painting.

The approach of the Hungryalists was to confront and disturb the prospective readers' preconceived colonial canons. According to Pradip Choudhuri, a leading philosopher and poet of the generation, whose works have been extensively translated in French, their counter-discourse was the first voice of post-colonial freedom of pen and brush. Besides the famous four mentioned above, Utpal Kumar Basu, Binoy Majumdar, Sandipan Chattopadhyay, Basudeb Dasgupta, Falguni Roy, Subhash Ghosh, Tridib Mitra, Alo Mitra, Ramananda Chattopadhyay, Anil Karanjai, Karunanidhan Mukhopadhyay, Pradip Choudhuri, Subimal Basak and Subo Acharya were among the other leading writers and artists of the movement.

== Origins ==
The origins of this movement stem from the educational establishments serving Chaucer and Spengler to the poor of India. The movement was officially launched, however, in November 1961 from the residence of Malay Roy Choudhury and his brother Samir Roychoudhury in Patna. They took the word Hungry from Geoffrey Chaucer's line "in sowre hungry tyme" and they drew upon, among others, Oswald Spengler's historiographical ideas about the non-centrality of cultural evolution and progression, for philosophical inspiration. The movement was to last from 1961 to 1965. It is wrong to suggest that the movement was influenced by the Beat Generation, since Ginsberg did not visit Malay until April 1963, when he came to Patna. Poets Octavio Paz and Ernesto Cardenal were to visit Malay later during the 1960s. The hungry generation has some of the same ideals as The Papelipolas and the Barranquilla Group, both from Colombia, and the Spanish Generation of 68.

== History ==
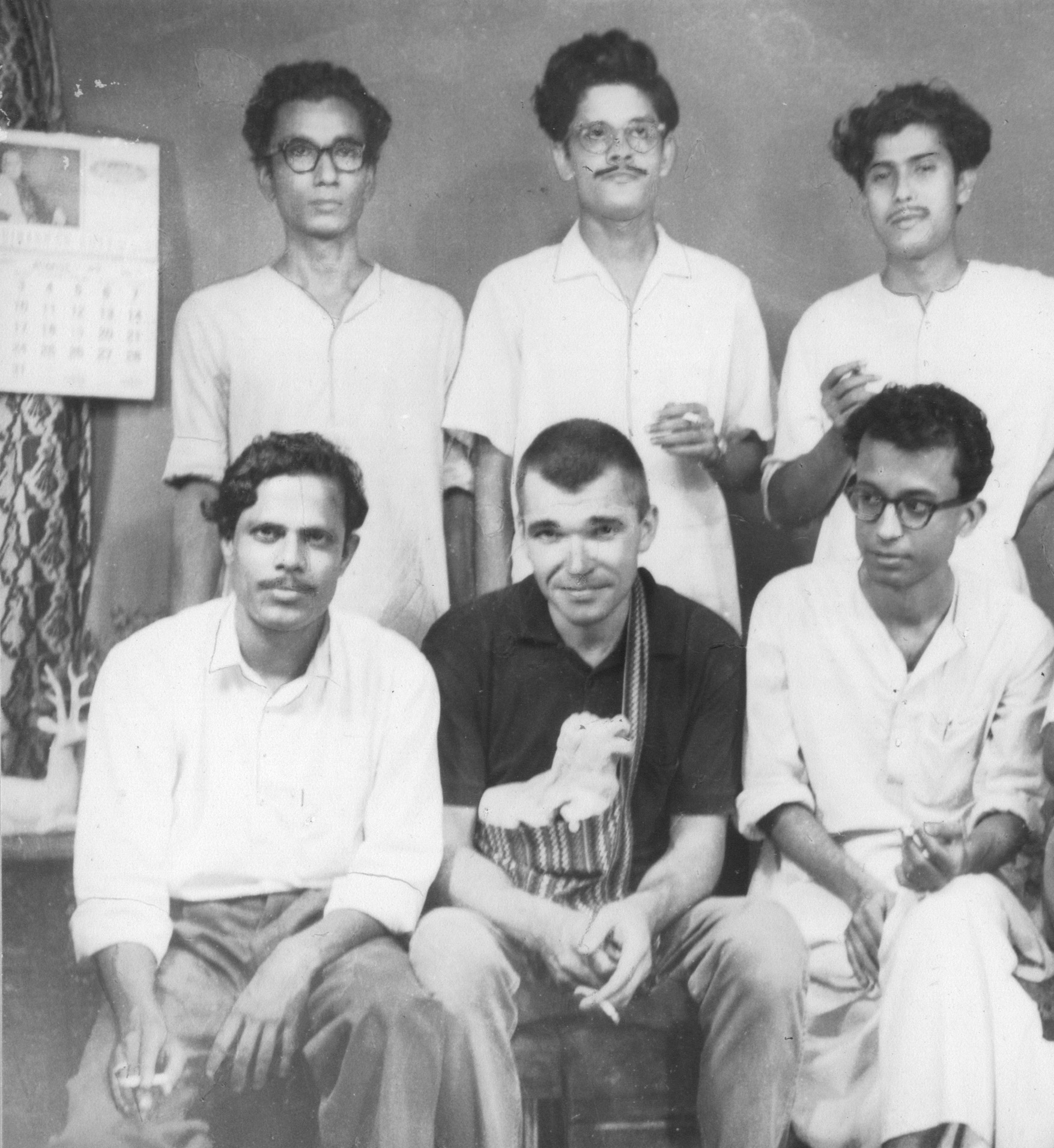
Writers of Hungry generation. From the top left moving clockwise: Saileswar Ghose, Malay Roy Choudhury and Subhas Ghose Basudeb Dasgupta, David Garcia and Subimal Basak.

This movement is characterized by expression of closeness to nature and sometimes by tenets of Gandhianism and Proudhonism. Although it originated at Patna, Bihar and was initially based in Kolkata, it had participants spread over North Bengal, Tripura and Benares. According to Dr. Shankar Bhattacharya, Dean at Assam University, as well as Aryanil Mukherjee, editor of Kaurab Literary Periodical, the movement influenced Allen Ginsberg as much as it influenced American poetry through the Beat poets who visited Calcutta, Patna and Benares during the 1960-1970s. Shakti Chattopadhyay, Saileswar Ghosh, Subhas Ghosh left the movement in 1964.

More than 100 manifestos were issued during 1961–1965. Malay Roy Choudhury's poems have been published by Prof P. Lal from his Writers Workshop imprint. Howard McCord published Malay's controversial poem Prachanda Boidyutik Chhutar (i.e. Stark Electric Jesus) from Washington State University in 1965. The poem has been translated into several languages of the world. Into German by Carl Weissner, in Spanish by Margaret Randall, in Urdu by Ameeq Hanfee, in Assamese by Manik Dass, in Gujarati by Nalin Patel, in Hindi by Rajkamal Chaudhary, and in English by Howard McCord.

== Impact ==
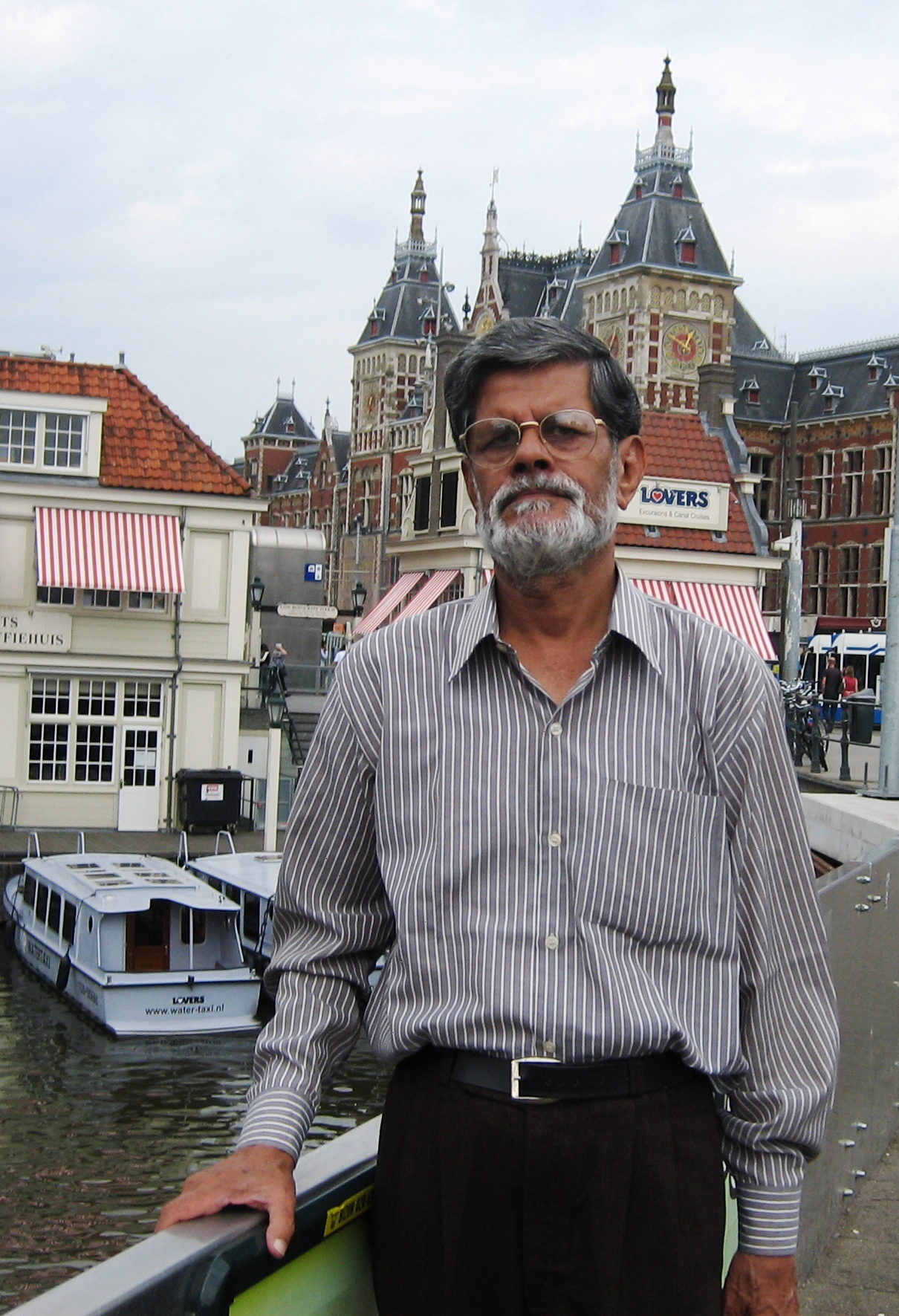
Malay Roy Choudhury

The works of these participants appeared in Citylights Journal 1, 2 and 3 published between 1964 and 1966, edited by Lawrence Ferlinghetti, and in special issues of American magazines including Kulchur edited by Lita Hornick, Klactoveedsedsteen edited by Carl Weissner, El Corno Emplunado edited by Margaret Randall, Evergreen Review edited by Barney Rosset, Salted Feathers edited by Dick Bakken, Intrepid edited by Alan De Loach, and The San Francisco Earthquake edited by Jacob Herman, during the 1960s. The Hungry Generation, also known as Hungryalism, challenged the mainstream literary genres. The group wrote poetry and prose in completely different forms and experimented with the contents. The movement changed the literary atmosphere of Bengal altogether. It had influences in Hindi, Marathi, Assamese and Urdu literature.

== Hungryalists and Krittibas ==
There is a misconception that the Hungryalists and the Krittibas group were the same and that the Krittibas magazine was a Hungryalist platform. This is incorrect as the Krittibas was a group from the fifties. The Hungryalist movement was a sixties decade phenomenon. Krittibas magazine in its editorial had openly declared that they have no relations with the movement and that they do not approve of the philosophy of the movement.

== See also ==
- List of underground newspapers of the 1960s counterculture

== Sources ==
- The autobiography of Malay Roy Choudhury is available in Vol 215 of "Contemporary Authors" published by Thomas Gale. (ISBN 0-7876-6639-4)
- There are Hungry Generation Archives in Northwestern University in Illinois as well as Bangla Academy in Dhaka, Bangladesh. At Kolkata the Little Magazine Library and Research Centre run by Sandip Dutta has a separate section on the Hungryalist publications as well as trial papers of the famous Hungry generation case in which some of the colleagues of Malay turned against the movement and gave undertakings to have withdrawn from the movement. Trial papers are archived in Bankshall Court, Kolkata (9th Court of Presidency Magistrate), Case No. GR. 579 of 1965; State of West Bengal Vs Malay Roy Choudhury
- Hungry Kimbadanti written by Malay Roy Choudhury and published by De Books, Kolkata (1997)
- Hungry Andolon issue of Haowa 49 magazine (2003) edited by Samir Roychoudhury and Murshid A. M.
- Hungry Andolon O Drohopurush Kotha written by Dr. Bishnu Chandra Dey and published by Sahayatri, Kolkata 700 009 (2013)
- Chandragrahan Hungry Andolon Special issue edited by Pranabkumar Chattopadhyay2, Dumdum, Kolkata 700 030 (October 2014)
