= Malay Roy Choudhury =

Indian writer and poet (1939–2023)

- মলয় রায়চৌধুরী
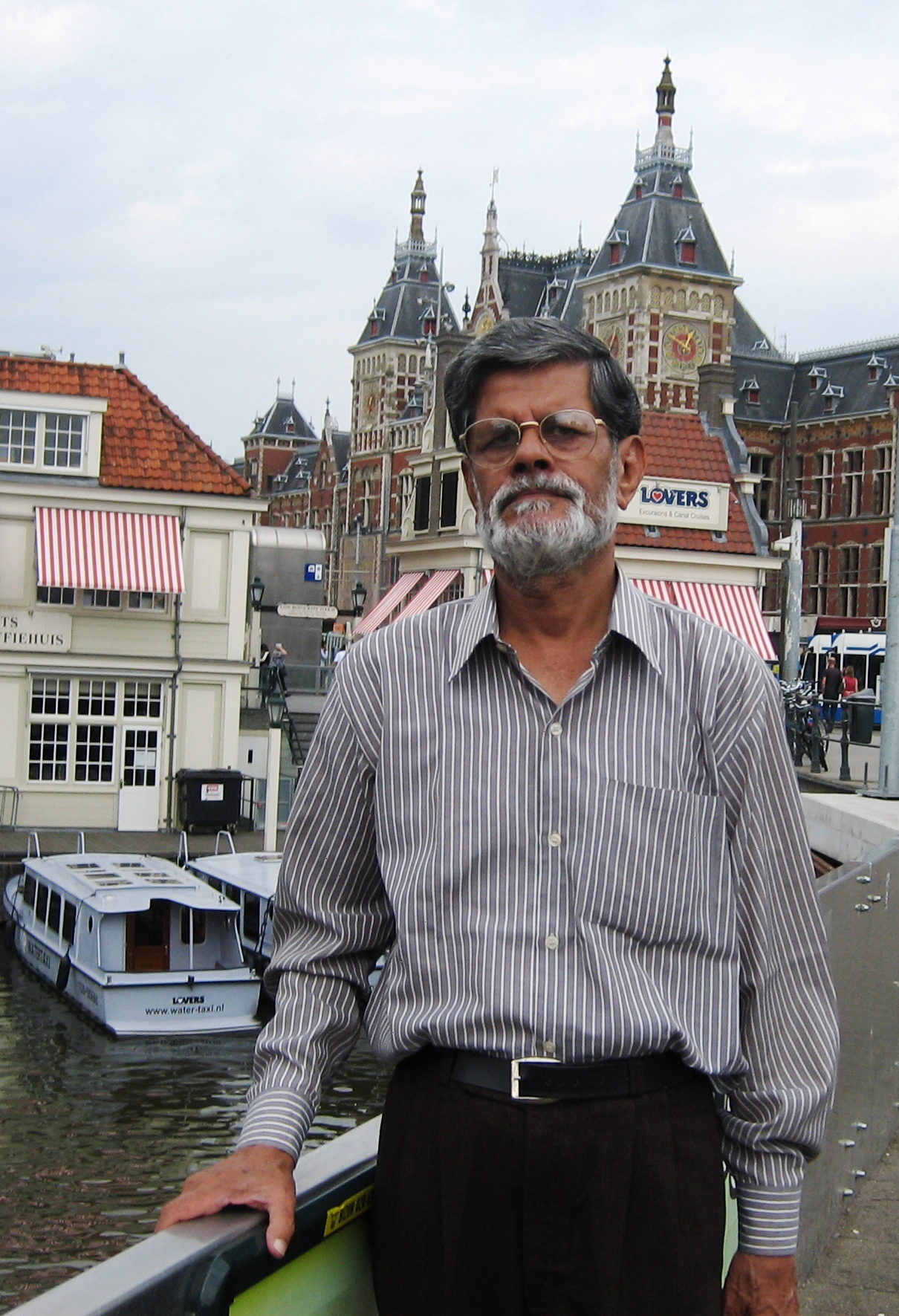
- Roy Choudhury in Amsterdam, 2009
- Born: 29 October 1939; Patna, Bihar Province, British India
- Died: 26 October 2023 (aged 83); British Indian (1939–1947); Indian (1947–2023)
- Citizenship: Indian
- Occupations: Poet, writer and journalist
- Years active: (1961–2023)
- Movement: Postmodernism and Hungryalism
- Spouse: Shalila Roy Choudhury
- Children: Anushree Prashant (daughter); Jitendra (son)
- Parents: Ranjit Roy Choudhury (1909–1991) (father); Amita (1916–1982) (mother)
- Relatives: Laksmikanta Roy Choudhury (grandfather); Samir Roychoudhury (brother)
- Family: Sabarna Roy Choudhury
- Awards: Sahitya Akademi Award (2003; refused)

Malay Roy Choudhury (29 October 1939 – 26 October 2023) was an Indian Bengali poet, playwright, short story writer, essayist and novelist who founded the Hungryalist movement in the 1960s.

== Early life and education ==
Malay Roy Choudhury was born in Patna, Bihar, India, into the Sabarna Roy Choudhury clan, which owned the villages that became Kolkata. He grew up in Patna's Imlitala ghetto, which was mainly inhabited by Dalit Hindus and Shia Muslims. His was the only Bengali family. His father, Ranjit Roy Choudhury (1909–1991) was a photographer in Patna; his mother, Amita (1916–1982), was from a progressive family of the 19th-century Bengali Renaissance. His grandfather, Laksmikanta Roy Choudhury, was a photographer in Kolkata who had been trained by Rudyard Kipling's father, the curator of the Lahore Museum.

At the age of three, Roy Choudhury was admitted to a local Catholic school, and later, he was sent to the Rammohan Roy Seminary Oriental Seminary. The school was administered by the Brahmo Samaj movement, a monotheistic religion founded in 1830 in Kolkata by Ram Mohun Roy, who aimed to purify Hinduism and recover the simple worship of the Vedas. There, Roy Choudhury met student-cum-librarian Namita Chakraborty, who introduced him to Sanskrit and Bengali classics. All religious activities were banned at the school, and Roy Choudhury has said that his childhood experience made him instinctively secular.

== Hungryalist movement ==
The Hungryalist movement was initially led by Malay; his brother, Samir Roychoudhury; Shakti Chattopadhyay; and Haradhon Dhara, known by his pseudonym Debi Roy. Thirty more poets and artists subsequently joined them, the best-known being Rajkamal Chaudhary, Binoy Majumdar, Utpal Kumar Basu, Falguni Roy, Subimal Basak, Tridib Mitra, Rabindra Guha, and Anil Karanjai. The movement's English name was derived from Geoffrey Chaucer's line "in the sowre hungry tyme", and its philosophy was based on Oswald Spengler's "The Decline of the West".

Hungryalism petered out in 1965, when the West Bengal government issued arrest warrants for eleven Hungryalists, including Roy Choudhury and his brother. Some members, such as Subhash Ghosh and Saileshwar Ghosh, testified against Roy Choudhury in Kolkata's Bankshall Court. He was jailed for a month for his poem Stark Electric Jesus by Kolkata Bankshall Court in 1966. However he was exonerated by the Kolkata High Court in 1967. From the letters of Sunil Gangopadhyay written to Sandipan Chattopadhyay during 1964 published recently it is known that Sunil Gangopadhyay felt that Hungry generation literary movement was a threat to his Krittibas group of poets of 1950s.

Howard McCord, a professor of English at Washington State University and Bowling Green University who met Roy Choudhury during a visit to Kolkata, wrote in City Lights Journal Number Three: "Malay Roy Choudhury, a Bengali poet, has been a central figure in the Hungry Generation's attack on the Indian cultural establishment since the movement began in the early 1960s. ... Acid, destructive, morbid, nihilistic, outrageous, mad, hallucinatory, shrill—these characterize the terrifying and cleansing visions" that "Indian literature must endure if it is to be vital again."

Both the Bangla Academy and Northwestern University have archives of Roy Choudhury's Hungryalist publications.

Roy Choudhury wrote three drama during the Hungryalism movement: Illot, Napungpung and Hibakusha, considered to be a mash-up of the Theatre of the Absurd and Transhumanism.

== Poetry and translations ==
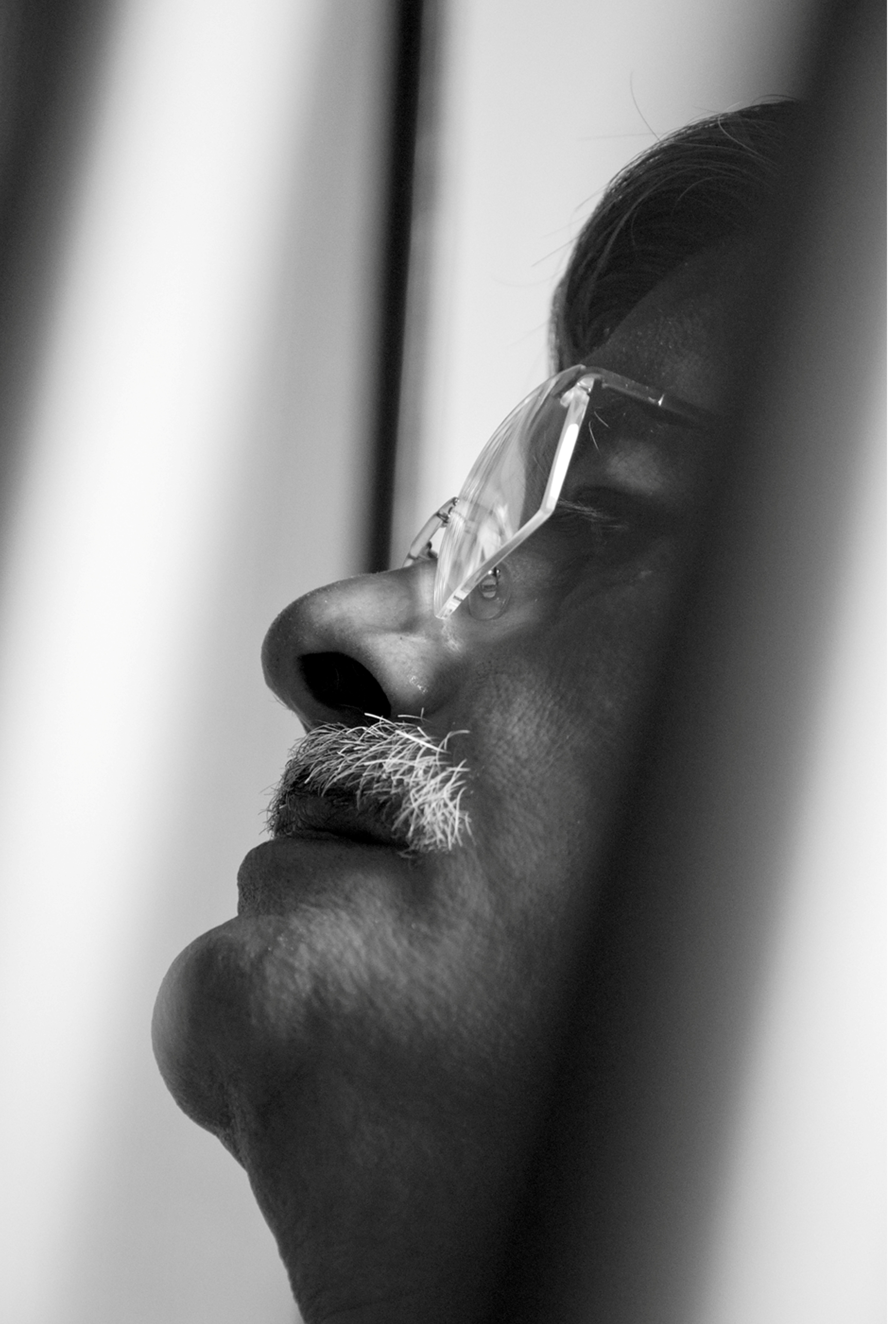
Roy Choudhury in 2009

With his 1963 poem "Prachanda Baidyutik Chhutar" ("Stark Electric Jesus"), which prompted the government's actions against the Hungryalists, Roy Choudhury introduced Confessional poetry to Bengali literature. The poem defied traditional forms (e.g., sonnet, villanelle, minnesang, pastourelle, canzone, etc.), as well as Bengali meters (e.g., matrabritto and aksharbritto). His poem "Jakham" is better known and has been translated into multiple languages.

His best-known poetry collections are Medhar Batanukul Ghungur, Naamgandho, and Illot, and a complete collection of his poems was published in 2005. He has written about 60 books since he launched the Hungryalist movement in November 1961.

Roy Choudhury also translated into Bengali works by William Blake ("The Marriage of Heaven and Hell"), Arthur Rimbaud ("A Season in Hell"), Tristan Tzara (Dada manifestos and poems), André Breton's Surrealism manifesto and poems, Jean Cocteau ("Crucifixion"), Blaise Cendrars ("Trans-Siberian Express"), and Allen Ginsberg ("Howl" and "Kaddish"). He has also translated Paul Celan's famous poem "Death Fugue".

Roy Choudhury wrote extensively on the life and works of Allen Ginsberg, Henry Miller, James Joyce, Charles Baudelaire, Jean Arthur Rimbaud, Osip Mandelstam, Marcel Proust and Anna Akhmatova.

In 2003, he was given the Sahitya Academy award, the Indian government's highest honour in the field, for translating Dharamvir Bharati's Suraj Ka Satwan Ghora. However, he declined to accept this award and others.

== Adhunantika phase ==
In 1995, Roy Choudhury's writings, both poetry and fiction, took a dramatic turn. A linguist, Probal Dasgupta, dubbed this the Adhunantika Phase (Bengali: অধুনান্তিক পর্ব), a portmanteau of two Bengali words: adhuna, meaning "new", "current", "contemporary", or "modern", and antika, meaning "closure", "end", "extreme", or "beyond". His poetry collections from this phase are Chitkar Samagra, Chhatrakhan, Ja Lagbey Bolben, Atmadhangser Sahasrabda, Postmodern Ahlader Kobita, and Kounaper Luchimangso. His novels from the period include Namgandho, Jalanjali, Nakhadanta, Ei Adham Oi Adham, and Arup Tomar Entokanta.

During this phase Roy Choudhury wrote several poetic dramas which were a mash-up of Postmodernism and Transhumanism.

After Roy Choudhury shifted to Mumbai from Calcutta he ventured into Magic realism and wrote novels such as Labiyar Makdi, Chashomranger Locha, Thek Shuturmurg, Jungle Romio, Necropurush and Naromangshokadhoker Halnagad.

In 2014 Roy Choudhury wrote his autobiography in his distinct style titled Rahuketu.

== Personal life ==
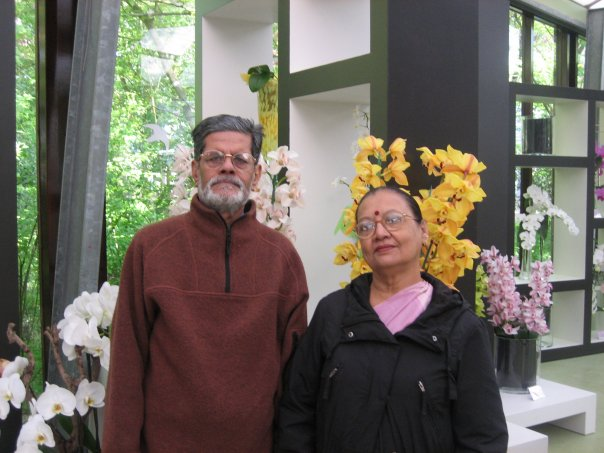
Roy Choudhury with his wife, Shalila, in The Hague in 2009

Roy Choudhury lived in Mumbai with his wife, Shalila, who was a field hockey player from Nagpur. Their daughter, Anushree Prashant, lives in Dubai with her husband and two daughters; his son Jitendra lives in Riyadh with his wife Sudipta.

Roy Choudhury died on 26 October 2023, at the age of 83.

== In popular culture ==
A 2014 film based on Roy Choudhury's poem Stark Electric Jesus was directed by Mrigankasekhar Ganguly and Hyash Tanmoy. It was an official selection at 20 international film festivals in 15 countries. The film won "Best Video Art" in Poland, "Most Promising Video Artist" in Spain, and "Best Fantasy Film" in Serbia.

Srijit Mukherji directed a film in 2011 titled Baishe Srabon, in which Roy Choudhury's poetry was used many times.

== Sources and references ==
- Malay Roy Choudhury-r Bitarka, edited by Madhusudan Roy. Barnik Prakashon, Bardhaman, West Bengal, India (2018).
- Malay Roy Choudhury Compendium, edited by A.M. Murshid. Avishkar Prakashani, Kolkata, India (2002).
- Hungryalist Interviews of Malay Roy Choudhury, edited by Ajit Ray. Mahadiganta Publishers, Kolkata (1999).
- Postmodern Interviews of Malay Roychoudhury, edited by Arabinda Pradhan. Graffiti Publishers, Kolkata (2004).
- Van Tulsi Ki Gandh, by Phanishwarnath Renu. Rajkamal Prakashan, Delhi, India (1984).
- Hungry Shruti & Shastravirodhi Andolon, by Uttam Das. Mahadiganta Publishers, Kolkata (1986).
- Shater Dashaker Kabita, by Mahmud Kamal. Shilpataru Prakashani, Dhaka, Bangladesh (1991).
- Hungry-Adhunantik Malay, edited by Ratan Biswas. Ahabkal Publications, Kolkata (2002).
- Salted Feathers, edited by Dick Bakken. Portland, Oregon (1967).
- Intrepid, edited by Carl Weissner. Buffalo, New York (1968).
- English Letters to Malay, edited by Tridib Mitra. Hungry Books, Howrah, India (1968).
- Bangla Letters to Malay, edited by Alo Mitra. Hungry Books, Howrah (1969).
- SWAPNA (Malay Roy Choudhury Special Issue, 15th Year, #1), edited by Bishnu Dey. Nabin Chandra College, Assam (2008).
- Sambhar: Malay Roy Choudhury Interview, by Amitava Deb. Sambhar Publications, Silchar, Assam, India (2008).
- Savarna Barta: Hungryalist Movement and Sabarna Roy Choudhury Clan, by Sonali Mukherjee. Tarkeshwar College, Kolkata (2008).
- Bodh: Malay Roy Choudhury's Poetry, by Uttam Chakraborty. Rupnarayanpur, West Bengal, India (2008).
- Stark Electric Jesus, with foreword by Howard McCord. Tribal Press (1965).

== Selected works ==
English

Stark Electric Jesus, with introduction by Howard McCord, Tribal Press, Washington DC, 1965.

Autobiography, CAAS #14 and 215, Gale Research Inc., Ohio, 1980.

Selected Poems, with introduction by P. Lal, Writers Workshop, Kolkata, 1989.

Hattali (long poem), Mahadiganta Publishers, Kolkata, 1989.

Overview: Postmodern Bangla Poetry (non-fiction), Haowa 49 Publishers, Kolkata, 2001.

Overview: Postmodern Bangla Short Stories (non-fiction), Haowa 49 Publishers, Kolkata, 2001.

Bengali

Shoytaner Mukh (Collected Poems), Krittibas Prakashani, Kolkata, 1963.

Hungry Andoloner Kavyadarshan (Hungryalist Manifesto), Debi Ray, Howrah, 1965.

Jakham (long poem), Zebra Publications, Kolkata, 1966.

Kabita Sankalan (collection of Hungryalist poems), Mahadiganta Publishers, Kolkata, 1986.

Chitkarsamagra (postmodern poems), Kabita Pakshik, Kolkata, 1995.

Chhatrakhan (postmodern poems), Kabitirtha Publishers, Kolkata, 1995.

Allen Ginsberg's Kaddish (translation), Kabitirtha Publishers, Kolkata, 1995.

Ja Lagbey Bolben (postmodern poems), Kaurab Prakashani, Jamshedpur, 1996.

Tristan Tzara's Poems (translation), Kalimati Publishers, Jamshedpur, 1996.

Allen Ginsberg's Howl (translation), Kabita Pakshik, Kolkata, 1996.

Jean Cocteau's Cricifixion (translation), Kabita Pakshik, Kolkata, 1996.

Blaise Cendrar's Trans-Siberian Express (translation), Amritalok Prakashani, Midnapur, 1997.

A (deconstruction of 23 poems), Kabita Pakshik, Kolkata, 1998.

Autobiography of Paul Gauguin (translation), Graffiti Publishers, Kolkata, 1999.

Jean Arthur Rimbaud (critique), Kabitirtha Publishers, Kolkata, 1999.

Life of Allen Ginsberg (non-fiction), Kabitirtha Prakashani, Kolkata, 2000.

Atmadhangsher Sahasrabda (collected poems), Graffiti Publishers, Kolkata, 2000.

Bhennogalpo (collection of postmodern short stories), Dibaratrir Kavya, Kolkata, 1996.

Dubjaley Jetuku Prashwas (novel), Haowa 49 Publishers, 1994.

Jalanjali (novel), Raktakarabi Publishers, Kolkata, 1996.

Naamgandho (novel), Sahana Publishers, Dhaka, 1999.

Natoksamagra (collection of plays), Kabitirtha Prakashani, Kolkata, 1998.

Hungry Kimvadanti (Hungryalist memoir), Dey Books, Kolkata, 1994.

Postmodernism (non-fiction), Haowa#49 Publishers, Kolkata, 1995.

Adhunikatar Biruddhey Kathavatra (non-fiction), Kabita Pakshik, Kolkata, 1999.

Hungryalist Interviews (edited by Ajit Ray), Mahadiganta Publishers, Kolkata, 1999.

Postmodern Kalkhando O Bangalir Patan (non-fiction), Khanan Publishers, Nagpur, 2000.

Ei Adham Oi Adham (novel), Kabitirtha Publishers, Kolkata, 2001.

Nakhadanta (postmodern novel), Haowa 49 Publishers, Kolkata, 2001.

Poems: 2004-1961 (collection of poems), Avishkar Prakashani, Kolkata, 2005.

== See also ==
- Sabarna Roy Choudhury
- Hungry generation
- Samir Roychoudhury
