= Howard McCord =

American writer (born 1932)

Howard McCord (November 3, 1932 – November 3, 2022) was an American writer. He was an emeritus professor of English at Bowling Green State University, where he was director of the creative writing program for most of the past quarter-century.

== Early life ==
McCord was born in El Paso, Texas, and raised there at the family's Joy Ranches in New Mexico. He received his BA from the University of Texas at El Paso in 1957 and his MA from the University of Utah in 1958.

== Teaching career ==
He taught at Washington State University from 1960 to 1971 and at Bowling Green State University from 1971 to 2000. He has been a distinguished visiting professor at California State University, Northridge, the University of Alaska at Juneau, and Dine College in Tsaile, Arizona.

Along with Allen Ginsberg and Lawrence Ferlinghetti he introduced the Indian poets of the Hungry generation to the Western readers. He published Malay Roy Choudhury's poem "Stark Electric Jesus" to enable Roy Choudhury to meet expenses during his trial at Calcutta courts during the 1960s.

== Honors and awards ==
Among his honors and awards are two fellowships from The National Endowment for the Arts, two fellowships from The Ohio Arts Council, the 1990 Ohioana Award for Poetry, the Nancy Dasher Award for his novel, The Man Who Walked to the Moon, The 1988 Golden Nugget Award from the University of Texas at El Paso, the D.H. Lawrence Fellowship from the University of New Mexico, a Scholarly Achievement Award from BGSU and a research fellowship to Iceland and Lapland, a Fulbright Award to India, and a National Woodrow Wilson Fellowship. In 1996 he won the Loveless Award for the best article in Gun Digest.

== Work ==
McCord is the author of over three dozen books and has given readings from his work at more than two hundred universities. His newest books are Walking to Extremes in Iceland and New Mexico, NY:McPherson, 2008; L'homme qui marchait sur la lune, Paris:Gallmeister, 2008, and another edition, Quebec: Alto, 2008. His Complete Poems were published by Bloody Twin Press in 2002 and Swamp Songs & Tales, Muncie:Mississinewa Press, 2007.

== Selected books ==
- McCord, Howard (1968). Longjaunes His Periplus. Kayak Press. ISBN 978-0-929701-51-6.
- McCord, Howard; Enslin, Theodore; Elliott, Harley (1975). The selected poems of Howard McCord, 1955-1971. Trumansburg, N.Y. ISBN 0-912278-56-0. OCLC 1230652.
- McCord, Howard (1997). The Man who Walked to the Moon: A Novella. McPherson. ISBN 978-0-929701-51-6.
- McCord, Howard (2008). Walking to Extremes in Iceland and New Mexico. McPherson & Company. ISBN 978-0-929701-86-8.

== Sources ==
- Contemporary Authors; Autobiography series, volume 9, Detroit: Gale Research, 1989. and author.
