= Stark Electric Jesus =

- Film poster
- Directed by: Hyash Tanmoy, Mrigankasekhar Ganguly
- Written by: Hyash Tanmoy, Mrigankasekhar Ganguly
- Based on: Stark Electric Jesus by Malay Roy Choudhury
- Produced by: Hyash Tanmoy, Arindam Biswas
- Starring: Mrigankasekhar Ganguly, Srija Bhattacharjee
- Narrated by: Malay Roy Choudhury
- Cinematography: Mrigankasekhar Ganguly, Purab Mukherjee
- Edited by: Mrigankasekhar Ganguly, Purab Mukherjee, Nivedita
- Distributed by: Hyash Tanmoy from ZERO DEGREE ARTS
- Release date: 22 September 2014 (USA)
- Running time: 12 minutes
- Country: India
- Budget: 5000 INR

Stark Electric Jesus is a 2014 short film inspired by the poem Prochondo Boidyutik Chhutar or Stark Electric Jesus written by Malay Roy Choudhury. The film has won the official selection as the only Indian film at the Trinidad and Tobago Film Festivalin New Media section and has been selected for screening at Leeds Independent Film Festival. The film also won 27 official selection in 20 different countries and also won 'Best Video Art' from Poland, 'Most Promising Artist' Award from Madatac, 06, Spain and 'Best Fantasy Film' award from Hrizantema International Horror and Fantasy Film Festival, Serbia.

== Plot ==
A mentally disordered man hallucinates and dreams 'unnatural' things where comes references of mythology, sexual identity and protest against sexual harassment.

== Cast ==
- Anirban Laulaa as bride from the refugees
- Kingshuk Das as a refugee
- Mriganka sekhar Ganguly as Mental Patient
- Satyajit Biswas as Groom From the Refugees
- Srija Bhattacharya as Sex worker
- Sudipta Das as Sex worker
- Sanjukta Ghosh as bride from the refugees

== Cine-poem ==
This is probably the first cine-poem (cine-poetry) or poefilm or Film-poem in India. It breaks the narrative structure and creates a language of poetry in film.

== Selections and awards ==
- Zoom International Film Festival, Poland (2016)
- Feminist and Queer International Film Festival (Nov 2015)

Bucharest, Romania

- Hrizantema International Horror & Fantasy Film Festival (Nov 2015)

Subotica, Serbia/Montenegro Awards Best Fantasy Film

- Festival de Cine Experimental de Bogotá / CineAutopsia (Sep 2015)

Bogotá, Colombia Awards Nomination for Best Film - Coctel Inauguración [Sala Fundadores]

- Cinema Perpetuum Mobile International Short Film Festival (Apr 2015)

Minsk, Belarus Awards Nomination for Best Experimental Film

- Family Film Project (Dec 2014)

Porto, Portugal Awards Nomination for Best Film

- Madatac - Contemporary Festival of New Media Arts & Advanced Audio Visual Technologies (Dec 2014)

Barcelona, Spain Awards Most Promising Video Artist Award

- International Frontale film festival (Nov 2014)

Wiener Neustadt, Austria Awards Nomination for Best Film

- Festival Internacional de Cinema Gai i Lèsbic de Barcelona (Oct 2014)

Barcelona, Spain Awards Nominee for Best Short Film-LGTIB Award

- No Gloss Film Festival (Oct 2014)

Leeds, United Kingdom

- Paris Festival for Different and Experimental Cinemas (Oct 2014)

Paris, France Awards Nomination for Best Prix : Compétition Internationale

- CologneOFF X – 10th Cologne International Videoart Festival( (Sep 2014)

Cologne, Germany

- Gender Reel Festival (Sep 2014)

Boston, U S A

- Trinidad & Tobago Film Festival (Sep 2014)

Port of Spain, Trinidad and Tobago

- WNDX Festival of Moving Image (Sep 2014)

Manitoba, Cameroon

- flEXiff 2014 (The Twelfth and the Last Experimental International Film Festival (Sep 2014)

Sydney, Australia

- Fuencaliente Rural Film Festival (Aug 2014)

Balearic Islands, Spain

- Haxan Film Festival (Aug 2014)

Oakland, U S A

- Dialogues International LGBT Film Festival(2015)

Kolkata, India

- Les Lieux de Traverse Vidéo: Du 17 Au 31 Mars
- Post Mortem, Mexico
