= Abani Bari Achho =

Bengali poem

Abani Bari Achho (Bengali: অবনী বাড়ি আছো, romanized: Ôboni Baŗi Achho) is a poem by Shakti Chattopadhyay. It is considered one of the iconic poems of modern Bengali poetry. It is included in his seminal early collection ধর্মেও আছো জিরাফেও আছো Dhôrmeo achho jirafeo achho (You are into religion, You are into giraffes), published in 1965.
