= Sandipan Chattopadhyay =

Indian Bengali language writer (1933-2005)

- Born: 25 October 1933; Howrah, Bengal Presidency, British India
- Died: 12 December 2005 (aged 72); Kolkata, West Bengal, India
- Education: University of Calcutta (B.A.)
- Occupation: Writer
- Spouse: Rina Chattopadhyay (m. 1965)
- Children: Trina Chattopadhyay (b. 1966)
- Writing career
- Language: Bengali
- Notable works: Aami O Banabihari (আমি ও বনবিহারী), Dhangsher Madhya Diye Jatra (ধ্বংস্বের মধ্য দিয়ে যাত্রা)
- Notable awards: Sahitya Akademi Award (2002), Bankim Puraskar (1995)
- Movements: Anti-establishment, Hungryalist Movement

Sandipan Chattopadhyay (25 October 1933 – 12 December 2005) was an Indian Bengali writer. His 1961 book "Kritadas Kritadasi" changed the landscape of Bengali fiction and made his name. A staunch anti-establishment figure and a supporter of creative freedom, Sandipan for some time refused association with the big Bengali publishing houses.

He was one of the pioneers of the Hungryalism Movement হাংরি আন্দোলন, also known as the Hungry generation, during 1961–65, though he, along with Binoy Majumdar, Shakti Chattopadhyay quit the movement over literary differences with fellow members Malay Roy Choudhury, Subimal Basak, Tridib Mitra and Samir Roychoudhury.

He was awarded the Sahitya Academy award for his book Ami O Banabihari.In His Sahityo Academy Award-winning novel Ami O Banabihari (2000), Sandipan fashions a very subtle critique of the ruling Communist party on the basis of an exclusion and silencing of the real ‘sub-altern’—the tribal proletariat. His decision to dedicate the novel to Budhyadeb Bhattacharya (called ‘poet, dramatist and minister’ in the dedicatory note) is a funny little polemic! He died after a prolonged respiratory illness in December 2005.

Some of his best known writings include Cholerar Dingulite Prem, "Shaper Chokher Bhitor Diye" (short story), Kukur Samparke Duto Ekta Katha Ja Ami Jani, "Seishab Dinratri" (short story), Hiroshima, My Love, Astitva Atithi Tumi, Esho Nipabane, Kritodas kritodasi, Biplob o Rajmohan, Rubi kakhon asbe, Jongoler Dinratri, Ami Arob Guerrilla der sSomorthon Kori, Double bed a eka, and Swarger nirjon upokule.

== Literary career ==
Sandipan's first publication was a book of short stories, ‘Kritadash Kritadashi’ (1961); his second collection of short stories ‘Shamabeto Protiddwandi o Anyanyo’ was published after a hiatus of nine years. In the late 1960s he initiated a series of self-published works, including ‘Biplab O Rajmohon (1969)’, ‘Shomen Paliter Boibahik (1970)’ and ‘25she Boishakher Shurjo (1970)’. Called ‘the prince of little magazines’ by friend and fellow poet Shakti Chattopadhyay, Sandipan's novel ‘Ekhon Amar Kono Ashukh Nei’ was published in the annual Anandabazar Patrika in 1977, after which his novels and short stories were published by big houses such as Protikhhon and Ajkal.

Soon after the publication of his early masterpiece ‘Bijoner Raktomangsho’, when everyone started to compare him with Albert Camus, Sandipan declared, he had not read Camus. However, he called himself ‘Camus-kator’(i.e. in awe of Camus) after reading him later. His other favourite European writers were Franz Kafka and Jean Genet. Poet Shankha Ghosh called him the ‘only contemporary European-minded Bengali author’. Fellow writer Shyamal Gangopadhyay jokingly said that Sandipan always wrote great French in Bengali and also considered his novel Hiroshima, My Love (1989) to be the first truly international novel written in the language.

As an admirer of Kamalkumar Majumdar and his inheritance of a Bankimi brand of Bengali modernity as different from the Tagorian model on one hand and someone steeped into the European avant garde on the other, Sandipan's aesthetics have an ambivalent dialogue between indigenous and the Western. While he held himself as a true Indian writer on the ground of writing in the vernacular, he also expressed his wish of undergoing his own funeral journey not with a Gita, but a copy of James Joyce's Ulysses on his chest.

Sandipan's reception in the 60s was marked with the European existentialist ambit of Kafka, Camus, Sartre and so on. Sandipan's works indeed have echoes from these authors and narrative situations that can be seen as a representation of the absurdist human condition. Rubi in Rubi Kakhan ashbe (1993) is reminiscent of Samuel Beckett's Godot as a principle of absence and Rajmohon in Biplab O Rajmohon is definitely influenced by Camus's notions of suicide.

Sandipan joined Ajkal as an employee in the 1980s and his novels became a regular feature in the Pujo-shankhyas of Ajkal from then on until his death. As the Ajkal edition of his complete novels testifies, he received two of the most coveted awards of the literary establishment — Bankim Purashkar in 1995 and Shahityo Academy Purashkar in 2002. As representative of an aggressively experimental postmodernist avant-garde, Sandipan Chattopadhyay alternated between the mainstream and the parallelstream, the establishment and the anti-establishment, blurring their distinctions in the process.

=== Career in newspaper ===
Sandipan Chattopadhyay worked as an editorial assistant with Aajkaal Daily from its inception in 1981. There, he pioneered the publishing of images and letters to the editor. He continued his association with Aajkaal until his death. He published several works of fiction for this paper's Sarod (Annual) edition, which later became best-selling novels.

== List of works ==
=== Novels ===
Name of Book	Year Published
Ekak Pradarshani (একক প্রদর্শনী)	1971
Ekhon Amar Kono Asukh Nei (এখন আমার কোনো অসুখ নেই)	1977
Aami Arab Gurrela Der Samarthan Kori (আমি আরব গেরিলাদের সমর্থন করি)	1985
Jungleer Dinratri (জঙ্গলের দিনরাত্রি)	1988
Hiroshima, My Love (হিরোসিমা মাই লাভ)	1989
Astitva Atithi Tumi (অস্তিত্ব, অতিথি তুমি)	1990
Kukur Samparke Duto Ekta Katha Ja Ami Jani (কুকুর সম্পর্কে দুটো একটা কথা যা আমি জানি)	1991
Cholerar Dingulite Prem (কলেরার দিনগুলিতে প্রেম)	1992
Rikter Jatrai Jago (রিক্তের যাত্রায় জাগো)	1993
Rubi Kakhan Asbe (রুবি কখন আসবে)	1993
Ekhon Jibon Anek Satej Sasthye Bhara (এখন জীবন অনেক সতেজ স্বাস্থ্যে ভরা)	1994
Eso Nipabane (এসো, নীপবনে)	1995
Kolkatar Dinratri (কলকাতার দিনরাত্রি)	1996
Kolkata, Tumi Kar? (কলকাতা, তুমি কার)	1997
Kollage (কোলাজ)	1998
Bharatbarsha (ভারতবর্ষ)	1999
Aami O Banabihari (আমি ও বনবিহারী)	2000
Jakhan Sabai Chilo Garbhobati (যখন সবাই ছিল গর্ভবতী)	2001
Double Bed e Eka (ডাবল বেডে একা)	2001
Swarger Nirjon Upakule (স্বর্গের নির্জন উপকূলে)	2003
Nisiddho Swapner Diary (নিষিদ্ধ স্বপ্নের ডায়েরী)	2003
Dhangsher Madhya Diye Jatra (ধ্বংস্বের মধ্য দিয়ে যাত্রা)	2004

=== Short story collections ===
- Kritadas Kritadasi (ক্রীতদাস-ক্রীতদাসী) (1961)
- Samabeto Pratidwandhi O Ananya (সমবেত প্রতিদ্বন্দ্ধী ও অন্যান্য) (1969)
- Han Priyotama (হ্যাঁ প্রিয়তমা)
- Ek Je Chilo Dewal (এক যে ছিল দেয়াল)
- Sonali Danar Eagle (সোনালী ডানার ঈগল)

== Awards and honours ==
- 1995: Bankim Puraskar
- 2002: Sahitya Akademi Award for the book Aami O Banabihari

== Personal life ==
Sandipan was the seventh child of Upendranath Chattopadhyay and Narayani Chattopadhyay. In 1965 he married Rina Chattopadhyay. Trina Chattopadhyay, their only child, was born in 1966.

== See also ==
- Avant-garde
- Subimal Mishra
- Sunil Gangopadhyay
- Shakti Chattopadhyay
- Samir Roychoudhury
- Subimal Basak
- Basudeb Dasgupta
- Malay Roy Choudhury
- Tridib Mitra
- Hungry generation
- Binoy Majumdar
