= Lita Hornick =

The Congressional Record of February 29, 2000 with a "Tribute To Dr. Lita Hornick" by Representative Benjamin Gilman

Dr. Lita Romola Rothbard Hornick (1927–2000) was an American literary researcher, editor, publisher, patron of poets, and art collector, best known for the beatnik magazine Kulchur that she turned into the Kulchur Foundation.

== Life and career ==
Lita Rothbard was born in 1927 in Newark, New Jersey. In 1948 she obtained a BA from Barnard College. In 1949, she graduated with an MA and in 1958 with a Ph.D. Columbia University, writing her thesis on Dorothy Richardson and her dissertation on Dylan Thomas. After marrying Morton Hornick, she took over Kulchur starting with its third issue (1961), running it as a magazine until 1965. Subsequently, Hornick operated the Kulchur Press that she then turned into the Kulchur Foundation.
