= Tridib Mitra =

Indian writer and poet (Born: 1940)

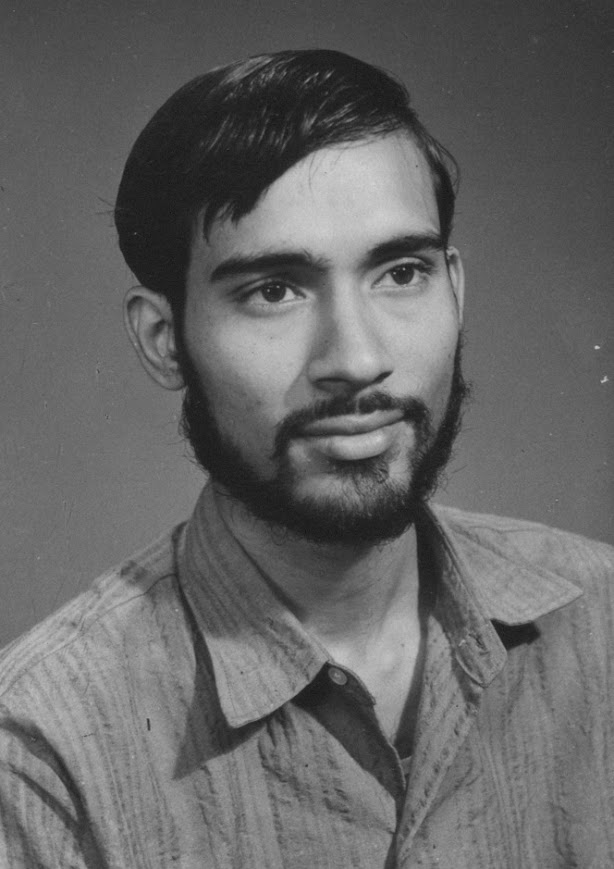
- Born: December 31, 1940; Kolkata, India
- Occupations: Poet, Activist, Writer, Humanitarian
- Spouse: Alo (Krishnakali) Mitra
- Children: Titas Mitra Saptarshi Mitra
- Relatives: Siladitya Sengupta Rhine Sengupta
- Writing career
- Pen name: Hari Mitra
- Language: English; Bengali
- Notable work: Ghulghuli (1965) Hatyakando (1967) Bagh Barudh Chal (2023)
- Literary movement: Hungry Generation

Tridib Mitra (born 31 December 1940) was an anti-establishment writer and part of the Hungry generation movement in Bengali literature of the 1960s. He emerges as one of the crucial figures of the Hungryalist constellation—those who extended and embodied the movement beyond its founding quartet. His work, including Ghulghuli (1965) and Hatyakando (1967), participates in what may be termed a poetics of abrasion: a language that resists lyric containment and instead foregrounds rupture, violence, and existential immediacy. The Hungry Generation itself (launched in 1961) was a deliberate affront to both colonial literary residues and bourgeois Bengali modernism. It sought to dismantle “preconceived colonial canons” and introduce a visceral, often obscene immediacy into literary language.

Along with his wife, Alo (Krishnakali) Mitra, he edited Hungry generation magazines The Waste Paper (in English) and Unmarga (in Bengali). Through these magazines, the Hungryalists disseminated manifestos (over 100 between 1961–65), constructed a transnational avant-garde network and destabilised linguistic hierarchies by moving between Bengali and English.

Mitra and his wife started poetry readings in burning ghats, graveyards, river banks, and country liquor joints of Kolkata. They also delivered Hungry generation masks of demons, jokers and gods to the offices and houses of ministers, administrators, newspaper editors and other bureaucrats of the West Bengali establishment.

== Childhood ==
From childhood, he used to raise various questions in his mind; against society, religion, and the distorted, sick faces of the state. For the masses, there was no protest or resistance; darkness loomed everywhere. In his life, there was no reconciliation between his ongoing education and reality. During this time, Tridib, along with his friends, began composing works that opposed established stability—rebellion against convention, and a bohemian way of life.

These experiences are reflected in Tridib's poetry. Tridib Mitra and Alo Mitra published the magazines Uttarshar and Waste Paper, which stirred considerable attention. In 1970, Prolapputra was published, and in 1972, Jwalanto. These two books created a stir among the literary circles and academicians of the time.

{{{1}}}

== Works ==
- Ghulghuli (Poetry) 1965
- Hatyakando (Poetry) 1967

== See also ==
- Falguni Roy
- Samir Roychoudhury
- Subimal Basak
- Shakti Chattopadhyay
- Malay Roy Choudhury
- Basudeb Dasgupta
- Sandipan Chattopadhyay
