= Bankshall Court =

Court in West Bengal

Coordinates: 22°34′18.1″N 88°20′46.7″E

Bankshall Court is officially the City Sessions Court of the Session Division of Kolkata (formerly Calcutta district) in India. It is locally known as Bankshall Court.

== History ==
The Court was named after Bankshall Street. The street was also named about this time from the Marine House, known by the Dutch name of Bankshall, which was near the Master Attendant's Office. This court was known as the Small Causes Court in British India. The buildings situated at 2 and 3, Bankshall Street near BBD Bag, Kolkata. Judicial works were inaugurated in this building in 1915. Two buildings of the court are very old having heritage.

== Jurisdiction ==
Total 1480 Sq. km area is under the jurisdiction of Bankshall Court and the number of Police Stations under the Court is 20. There are 41 judicial court rooms including City Sessions, Special (CBI) Court, Fast Track Courts, Chief Metropolitan Magistrate and Chief Judges courts.
