= Subimal Basak =

Indian fiction writer (Born: 1939)

- Occupation: Fiction writer
- Movement: Hungry Generation

Subimal Basak is an Indian fiction writer. He is a member of the Hungry generation, with Samir Roychoudhury, Falguni Roy, Shakti Chattopadhyay and the movement's creator Malay Roy Choudhury.

The Hungry Generation archive, and Weissner Archive with Subimal Basak Papers are held at Northwestern University; the Howard McCord archive is held at Washington State University.

== Awards ==
Subimal Basak was awarded the Sahitya Akademi Translation Prize for his translation Amar Tomar Tar Katha by the Government of India in 2008. He was felicitated by Alochana Chakra at the Bangla Academy in 2009.

== Film ==
Srijit Mukherji has directed a film titled Baishe Srabon in which famous Bengali director Gautam Ghose has portrayed the role of a Hungryalist intellectual. This was for the first time that Bengali avant garde literature has been incorporated into mainstream cinema.

== Works of Subimal Basak ==
- Chhatamatha (Novel). Published by Hungry Prokashani, Kolkata 700049. Cover designed by Malay Roy Choudhury. 1965
- Habijabi (Poems). Published by Hungry Printers, Howrah. Cover by Subimal Basak. 1970.
- Guerrilla Aakrosh (Short Stories). Published by Hungry prokashani, Kolkata 700049. Cover designed by Subimal Basak. 1974.
- Atmar Shanti Du Minit (Short Stories). Published by Hungry Prokashani, Kolkata 700049. Cover designed by Subimal Basak. 1985.
- Ajatha Khitkal (Short Stories). Published by Ebang Publishers, Kolkata 700034. Cover designed by Subimal Basak. 1987.
- Biyar Geet O Dhakai Chhora (Collection of Folk Songs). Published by Subimal Basak, Kolkata 700056. Cover designed by Subimal Basak. 1987.
- Kusanskar (Collection of Bengali Superstitions). Published by Subimal Basak. Cover designed by Subimal Basak. 1987.
- Protnibeej (Novel). Published by Haowa49 Publishers, Kolkata 700070. 1996.
- Casual Leave (Shorty Stories). Published by Graffiti, Kolkata 700029. Cover designed by Sharmi Pandey. 2000
- Bakbakani (Poems). Published by Sumeriya Publishers, Kolkata. Cover designed by Subimal Basak. 2000.
- Ethi (Short Stories). Published by Ebang Publishers, Kolkata 700047. Cover designed by Madhubani Painters. 2001.
- Kutti (Short Skits). Published by Subimal Basak.Kolkata. 2003.
- Tijorir Bhetor Tijori (Short Stories). Published by Haowa49 Publishers, Kolkata 700070. Cover designed by Subimal Basak. 2005.
- Gopan Dastabej O Sheetatap Niyantrito Atma (Short Stories). Published by Haowa49 Publishers, Kolkata 700070. Cover designed by Samir Roychoudhury.2007.

== Sources ==
- Chhitephota. An Anthology of articles on Subimal Basak edited by Dr. Sajal Ranjan Acharyya. 79 Station Road, Udaypur, Kolkata 400049.
- Van Tulsi Ki Gandh by Phanishwarnath Renu. Published by Rajkamal Prakashan, Delhi-2, India. (1984)
- Hungry Shruti & Shastravirodhi Andolon by Dr Uttam Das. Published by Mahadiganta Publishers, Kolkata, India. (1986)
- Salted Feathers edited by Dick Bakken, Portland, Oregon, USA. (HUNGRU Issue, 1967)
- Intrepid edited by Carl Weissner, Buffalo, NY, USA. (Hungry Issue, 1968)
- Milon: Subimal Basak Special edited by Biswajit Nandi, Tura, Meghalaya, India. (2007)
- Encyclopedia in Assamese (Vol VII) edited by Rajen Saikia. Published by Assam Sahitya Sabha, Jorhat, Assam. (2007)
- E-Kaler Gadya Padya Andoloner Dalil by Satya Guha. Published by Adhuna, Kolkata, India. (1970)
- Bangriji Sahitye Khudhito Bangsha by Jyotirmay Datta. DESH Literature Issue. Kolkata, India. (Bengali Year 1375)

== See also ==
- Shakti Chattopadhyay
- Malay Roy Choudhury
- Tridib Mitra
- Anil Karanjai
- Samir Roychoudhury
- Sandipan Chattopadhyay
- Basudeb Dasgupta
- Hungry generation
