= Samir Roychoudhury =

Indian Bengali-language Poet, Editor and Marine life Expert (1933-2016)

Samir Roy Chowdhury
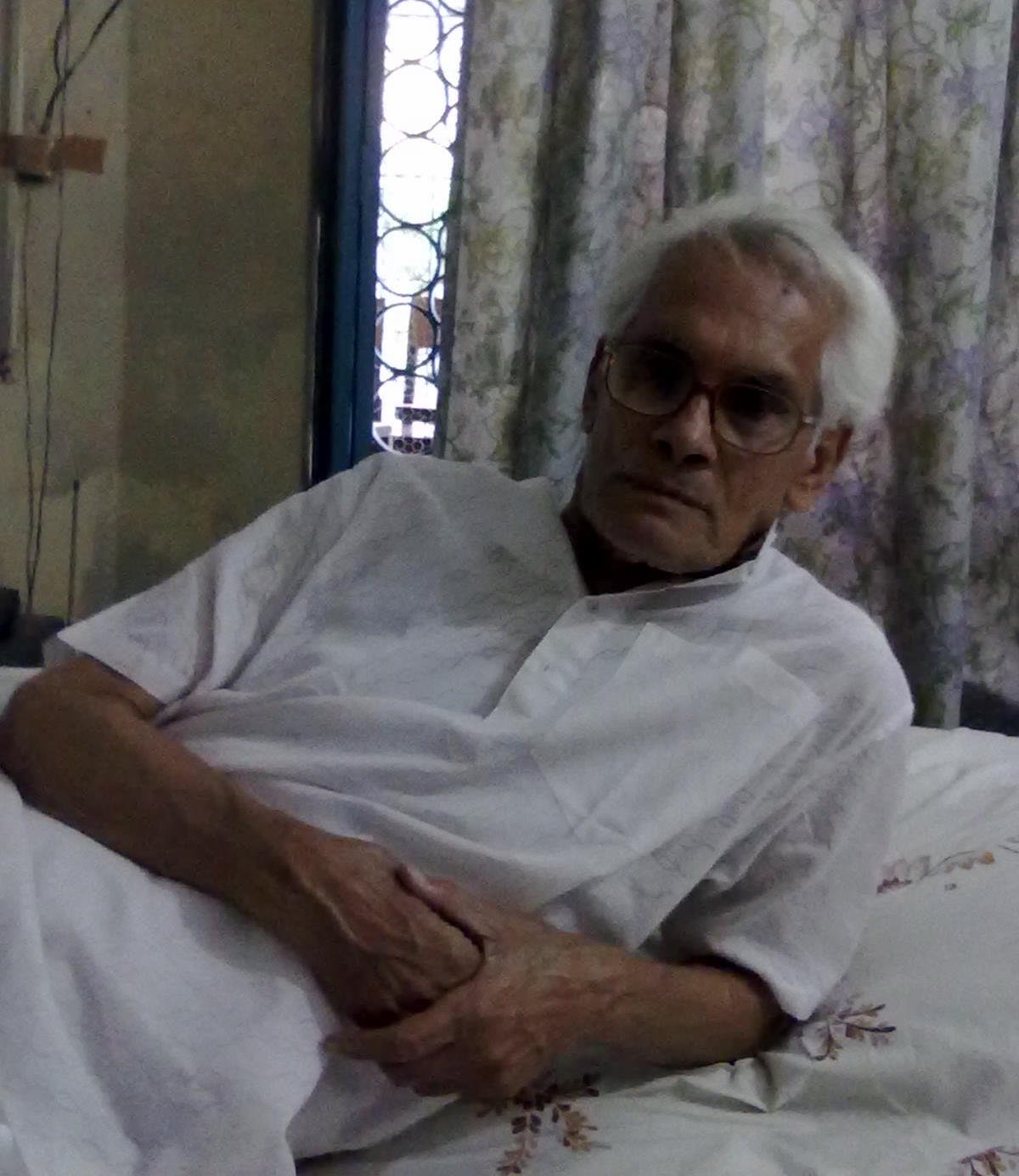
- Samir resting at home in Kolkata, West Bengal
- Born: 1 November 1933; Panihati, Bengal Presidency, British India
- Died: 22 June 2016 (aged 82); Kolkata (Calcutta), West Bengal, India
- Occupations: Poet and writer
- Movement: Postmodernism and hungryalism

Samir Roychowdhury (Bengali: সমীর রায়চৌধুরী) (1 November 1933 – 22 June 2016), one of the founding fathers of the Hungry Generation (also known as Hungryalism or Hungrealism (1961–1965)), was born at Panihati, West Bengal, in a family of artists, sculptors, photographers, and musicians. His grandfather Lakshminarayan, doyen of the Sabarna Roy Choudhury clan of Uttarpara, had learned drawing and bromide-paper photography from John Lockwood Kipling, father of Rudyard Kipling, who was Curator at the Lahore Museum (now in Pakistan), and thereafter established the first mobile photography-cum-painting company in India in the mid-1880s. The company was later taken over by Samir's father Ranjit (1909–1991). Samir's mother Amita (1916–1982) was from a progressive family of 19th-century Bengal renaissance.

== Seeds of Hungryalism ==
Samir's grandfather, Sri Lakshminarayan Roy Chowdhury established a permanent photography-cum-painting shop at Patna, Bihar in 1886, the city from which Samir, along with his younger brother Malay Roy Choudhury, Shakti Chattopadhyay and Debi Ray, had launched the Hungryalism (হাংরি আন্দোলন) movement in November 1961. Samir's uncle Pramod was Keeper of Paintings and Sculpture at the Patna Museum. Pramod's daughters, Sabitri and Dharitri were accomplished veena players and classical singers. Dharitri was a painter as well. Samir's mother Amita Banerjee came from a family where her father Dr.Kishori Mohan Bandyopadhyay was a fellow researcher and an assistant of Ronald Ross, Nobel Prize winner for discovering the causes of malaria. Right from childhood, Samir was thus in the company of people who could groom him for his later literary achievements.

== Krittibas Phase ==
Samir studied at City College, Calcutta, where he found as his classmates, Dipak Majumdar, Sunil Gangopadhyay and Ananda Bagchi, who were preparing to start an exclusive poetry magazine, named Krittibas (1953). Samir became an active member of the group. Sunil Gangopadhyay's first collection of poems Eka Ebong Koyekjan was funded and published by Samir. However, when Dipak Majumdar left Krittibas, Samir along with Sandipan Chattopadhyay, Ananda Bagchi and Utpalkumar Basu were eased out of the group, although Samir had edited the Phanishwarnath Renu issue of the magazine. Samir left the group and took up a job of marine fisheries expert in a ship which most of the time was in the Arabian Sea, an experience which was later beneficial for Hungryalism inputs. His first poetry collection Jharnar Pashey Shuye Aachhi (ঝর্ণার পাশে শুয়ে আছি) (i.e. "Sleeping Beside An Waterfall") was premised on the blueness of experience of this marine period.

== Among the People ==
From marine Samir shifted to inland fisheries, which gave him an opportunity to become a part of the poorest boatmen, fishermen and fishnet-knitters families of rural and riverine India. For three decades he travelled extensively in such tribal areas as Chaibasa, Dumka, Daltonganj, Bhagalpur, Muzaffarpur and Darbhanga etc. These places were the centres where the Hungryalist poets, writers and painters gathered and engaged in creative happenings which has become a part of Bengali literary folklore. During this period Samir emerged as one of the original thinkers, a school of thought later termed as Adhunantika by the famous linguist Dr Prabal Dasgupta. Young writers, poets and artists as well as filmmakers visited him during his tribal sojourn. Among the visitors were Octavio Paz, Allen Ginsberg, Peter Orlovsky, Gary Snyder, Rajkamal Choudhury, Phanishwarnath Renu, Dharmavir Bharati, Santoshkumar Ghosh, S H Vatsayan Ajneya, Falguni Ray, Basudeb Dasgupta, Subo Acharya, Tridib Mitra and Alo Mitra etc. Shakti Chattopadhyay stayed with him at Chaibasa for more than two years. He is still an important figure before the contemporary younger poets and thinkers (like Anupam Mukhopadhyay).

== Creative work ==
Creativity ran in the veins, so early in life, both Samir and his brother Malay directed many plays including 'Kauwa Babula Bhasm' the script of which was prepared by the noted writer Phanishwar Nath 'Renu'. Samir has been creative off and on. After his first collection of poems, he published Aamar Vietnam a collection of poems, though not based on Vietnam, but premised on the sensitivity of a person who lives in a different world and is regularly bombarded by war-news which is shockingly inhuman. Then after a decade his third collection of poems Janowar (জানোয়ার) (The Beast) was published written in a different vein. Among the Hungryalists, he is considered to be a master of word formation and language-plasticity. He shifted his base permanently to Calcutta (Kolkata) in the beginning of the 1990s and started his own magazine aptly called HAOWA#49 or Unapanchash Vayu in Sanskrit which is a state of unknown mind. He also started Haowa#49 Publications for which his younger brother Malay Roy Choudhury joined as Creative Consultant. HAOWA#49 (হাওয়া # ৪৯) magazine virtually changed the avant garde literary scene. People who were once critical of the Hungry Generation movement (হাংরি আন্দোলন), and even denigrated Hungryalism, started respecting them. Some post-graduate theses have been written on the two brothers, considered to have up-welled fresh mind-waves in an otherwise stagnant creative pool.

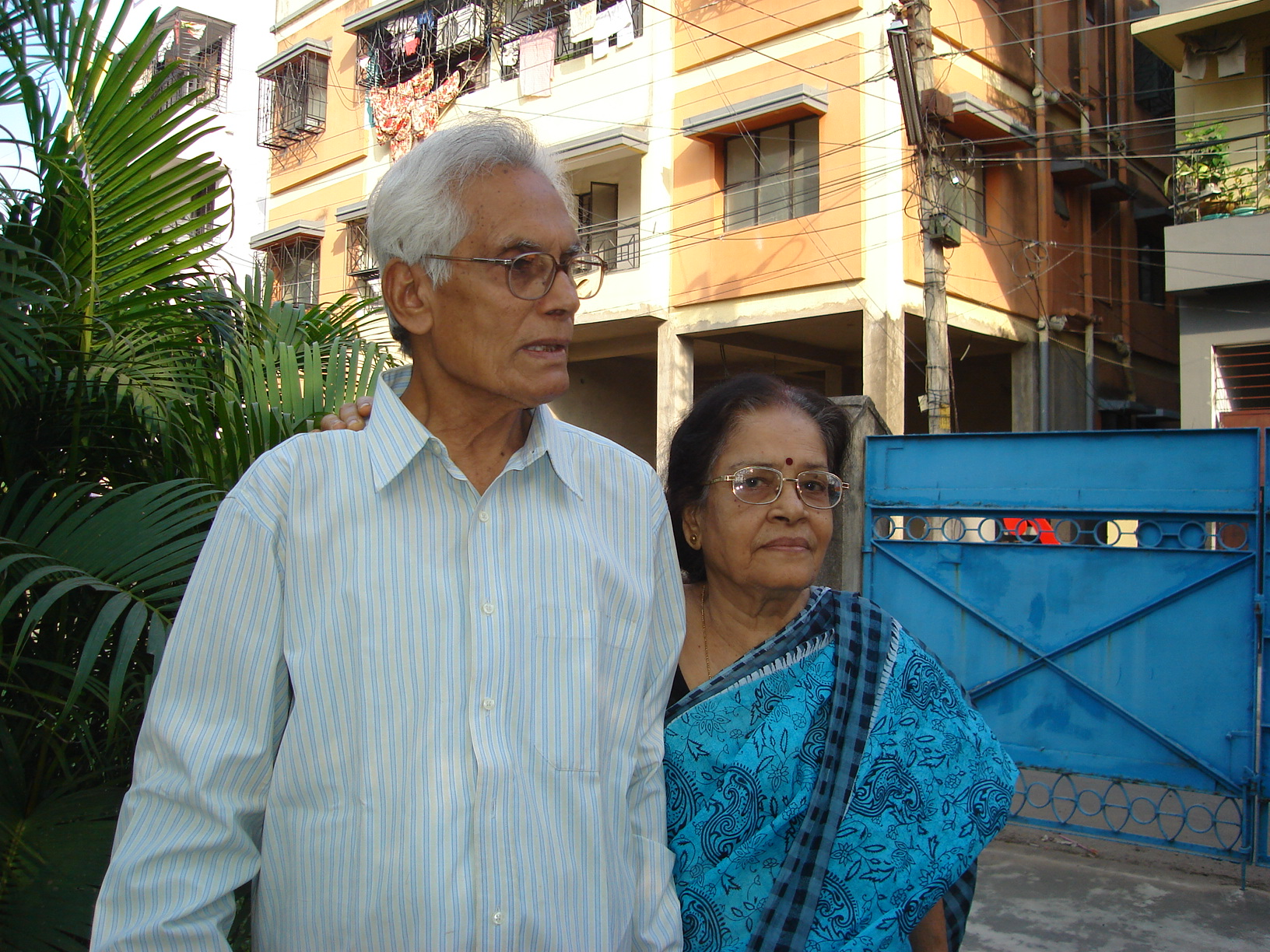
Samir with his wife Belarani in Bansdroni, Kolkata in 2010

== Adhunantika controversy ==
Samir wrote several treatises on Adhunantika aspects of Indian, especially Bengali society, that have impacted post-colonial mindset, and obviously arts, literature and culture. Critics have claimed that Adhunantika is Postmodern version of Hungryalism, and that postmodern features of Bengali creative writing had emerged way back in the 1960s when the Hungry generation movement was launched with freely distributed weekly bulletins which could have been published by any participant of the movement. Samir introduced an Indianised version of postmodernism which was being called, apart from Adhunantika, Uttaradhunika, Uttar-Adhunika, Bitadhunika, Bhashabadal, Atichetana and Adhunikottarvad etc. Hungryalism got a new valuation with these concepts, and the newer generation of poets, writers and thinkers got an alternative platform. Samir edited, since 1990, books on Ecofeminism, Postcolonialism, Postmodernism, Complexity, Hybridity and The Other. He edited Postmodern Bengali Poetry (2001) and Postmodern Bengali Short Stories (2002) which included writings from Bangladesh as well as entire India. Earlier only upper-caste writers from West Bengal used to have pride of place in such collections. Samir changed it all; he invited poems and short stories from all strata of, not only West Bengal, but entire India and Bangladesh. A new word Bahirbanga was coined by him for diasporic Bengalis.

== Film ==
In 2011 Srijit Mukherji directed a Bengali film titled Baishe Srabon wherein the role of Hungryalist poet was portrayed by film director Gautam Ghosh.

== See also ==
- Sunil Gangopadhyay
- Sandipan Chattopadhyay
- Basudeb Dasgupta
- Subimal Basak
- Tridib Mitra
- Anil Karanjai
- Rabindra Guha

== Sources ==
- Hungry Shruti & Shastravirodhi Andolan by Dr Uttam Das. Published by Mahadiganta Publishers, Kolkata, India. (1986)
- Van Tulsi Ki Gandh by Phanishwarnath Renu. Published by Rajkamal Prakashan, Delhi, India. (1984)
- Salted Feathers edited by Dick Bakken. Portland, Oregon, USA. (Hungry Issue 1967)
- Intrepid edited by Carl Weissner. Buffalo, NY, USA. (Hungry Issue 1968)
- Encyclopedia in Assamese (Vol VII) edited by Rajen Saikia. Published by Assam Sahitya Sabha, Jorhat, Assam, India. (2007)
- E-Kaler Gadya Padya Andoloner Dalil by Satya Guha. Published by Adhuna, Kolkata, India. (1970)
- Samir Roychowdhury Compendium edited by Aloke Goswami. Contributors: Rabindra Guha, Basab Dasgupta, Naser Hosain, Murshid A. M., Dr Nrisingha Murari Dey, Sujit Sarkar, Moulinath Biswas, Thakurdas Chattopadhyay, Dhiman Chakraborty, Partha Chattopadhyay, Ramkishore Bhattacharya, Ashok Tanti and Aloke Goswami. Galpobishwa Publishers, Siliguri, West Bengal, India. 2008.
- Samir Roychowdhury Compendium 2 edited by Arun Kumar Mukherjee.BODH. Contributors: Dhiman Chakraborty, Uttam Chakraborty, Anupam Mukhopadhyay, Bela Roychowdhury, Alok Goswami.
- Compendium 3 edited by Kajol Sen, Published from Jamshedpur, Jharkhand. Contributors: Malay Roychowdhury, Arabindo Prodhan, Nilanjan Chattopadhyay, Shankarnath Chakaroborty, Partho Chattopadhyay, Ram Kishore.
