= Shakti Chattopadhyay =

Bengali poet and writer

- Shakti Chattopadhyay
- Born: 25 November 1933; Jaynagar Majilpur, Calcutta, Bengal Presidency, British India
- Died: 23 March 1995 (aged 61); Calcutta, West Bengal, India
- Occupation: Poet
- Writing career
- Pen name: Sphulinga Samaddar
- Language: Bengali
- Period: 1961–1995
- Notable works: Abani Bari Achho; Jete Pari Kintu Keno Jabo
- Notable awards: Ananda Puraskar; Sahitya Akademi Award
- Literary movement: Hungry movement, Krittibas

Shakti Chattopadhyay (25 November 1933 – 23 March 1995) was a Bengali poet and writer. Known for surrealistic imagery, many of his poems unfolded in the wake of rapidly changing nature. In 1983, he received the Sahitya Akademi award for his poetry collection "Jete Pari Kintu Keno Jabo?".

The huge surprise and controversy surrounding his poetry have repeatedly moved the readers. The omnipotent humanity of the American Beatniks moved him at one time.

== Early life ==
Shakti Chattopadhyay was born in Jaynagar Majilpur, to Bamanath Chattopadhyay and Kamala Devi. He lost his father at the age of four and was brought up by his maternal grandfather. He passed Matriculation Examination in 1951 and got admitted to the City College to study commerce as his maternal uncle, who was a businessman and also his guardian, promised him a job of an accountant. In 1953, he passed Intermediate Commerce Examination, but gave up studying commerce and got admitted to the Presidency College (now Presidency University, Kolkata) with Honours in Bengali literature but he did not appear in the examination.

Shakti Chattopadhyay worked with Ananda Bazar Patrika from 1970 to 1994, and was a visiting professor at Visva Bharati University after his retirement.

== Literature career ==
He started writing novels to make a living from literature. Kuyotala was his first novel. His first collection of poems, Hey prem, Hey naishyabda (O love, O silence), published in 1956. Abani Bari Achho is a poem by Shakti Chattopadhyay. It is included in his seminal early collection Dhôrmeo achho jirafeo achho published in 1965. He also published 10 novels, several collections of travel writing, a collection of essays and Bengali translations.

== Notable works ==
- Kuyotala
- Hey prem, Hey naishyabda (O love, O silence)
- Jwalanta Rumal
- Āmāke jāgāo
- Dhôrmeo achho jirafeo achho : Abani Bari Achho
- Jete Pari Kintu Keno Jabo
- Padyasamagra
- Sakale pratyeke ekā
- Kabira galpa
- Agranthita padya
- Sandhyāra se-śānta upahāra
- Jongole Pahare
- Amar Rabindranath

== Awards ==
- Ananda Puraskar
- Sahitya Akademi Award
