= List of Marathi-language poets =

This is a list of Marathi language poets.

- Annabhau Sathe
- Arun Krushnaji Kamble
- Arun Kolatkar
- Atmaram Ravaji Deshpande, (Pen name: Anil)
- B. S. Mardhekar
- Bahinabai Chaudhari
- Balakrishna Bhagwant Borkar
- Bhau Panchbhai
- Bhaskar Ramchandra Tambe
- Changdev Maharaj
- Chintamani Tryambak Khanolkar, (Pen name: Aarti Prabhu)
- Dilip Chitre
- Dnyaneshwaro
- Eknath
- G. D. Madgulkar
- Guru Thakur
- Hemant Divate
- Indira Sant
- Janardanswamy
- Meet patil
- Kanhopatra
- Karmamela
- Keshav Pandit
- Kishor Kadam (Pen name: Saumitra)
- Krishnaji Keshav Damle (Pen name: Keshavasuta)
- Madhav Julian
- Mangesh Narayanrao Kale
- Mangesh Padgaonkar
- Manik Godghate, (Pen name: Grace)
- Manohar Oak
- Manya Joshi
- Mukundraj
- Namdeo Dhasal
- Namdeo Dhondo Mahanor
- P. S. Rege
- Patthe Bapurao
- Pralhad Keshav Atre (Pen name: Keshavkumar)
- Raghunath Pandit
- Raja Badhe
- Ram Joshi
- Sandeep Khare
- Sanjeev Khandekar
- Saraswati Gangadhar
- Suresh Bhat
- Samarth Ramdas
- Saleel Wagh
- Shankar Vaidya
- Shanta Shelke
- Tryambak Bapuji Thombre (Pen name: Balkavi)
- Tukaram
- Varjesh Solanki
- Vasant Abaji Dahake
- Vilas Sarang
- Vinayak Janardan Karandikar
- Vinayak Damodar Savarkar
- Vinda Karandikar
- Vishnu Vaman Shirwadkar (Pen name: Kusumagraj)
- Vishnu Wagh
- Vitthal Wagh
- Yashwant Dev

== See also ==
- List of Marathi writers
- List of Indian poets

Chintaman Khanolkar (pen Name Arati Prabhu)
