= Marathi literature =

Marathi literature is the body of literature of Marathi, an Indo-Aryan language spoken mainly in the Indian state of Maharashtra and written in the Devanagari and Modi script.

== History ==
=== Early history ===
As a written language, Marathi is probably first attested in a 739 CE copper-plate inscription found in Satara. Several inscriptions dated to the second half of the 11th century feature Marathi, which is usually appended to Sanskrit or Kannada in these inscriptions.

The earliest Marathi-only inscriptions are the ones issued during the Shilahara rule, including a c. 1012 CE stone inscription from Akshi taluka of Raigad district, and a 1060 or 1086 CE copper-plate inscription from Dive that records a land grant (agrahara) to a Brahmin. A 2-line 1118 CE Marathi inscription at Shravanabelagola records a grant by the Hoysalas. These inscriptions suggest that Marathi was a standard written language by the 12th century. However, there is no record of any actual literature produced in Marathi until the late 13th century.

=== Yadava period ===
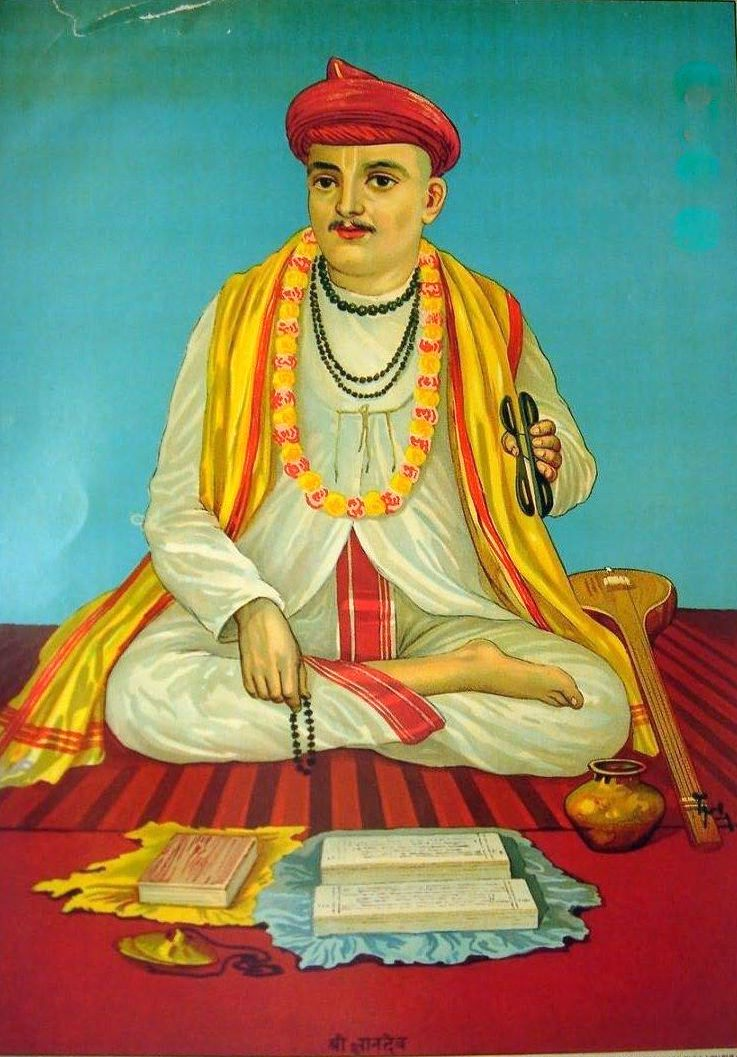
Dnyaneshwar as imagined by the Ravi Varma press

The early Marathi literature emerged during the Seuna (Yadava) rule, because of which some scholars have theorized that it was produced with support from the Yadava rulers. The Yadavas did regard Marathi as a significant language for connecting with the general public, and Marathi replaced Kannada and Sanskrit as the dominant language of the inscriptions during the last half century of the Yadava rule. However, there is no evidence that the Yadava royal court directly supported the production of Marathi literature with state funds.

The early Marathi literature was mostly religious and philosophical in nature, and was composed by the saint-poets belonging to Mahanubhava and Warkari sects. During the reign of the last three Yadava kings, a great deal of literature in verse and prose, on astrology, medicine, Puranas, Vedanta, kings and courtiers were created. Nalopakhyana, Rukminiswayamvara and Shripati's Jyotisharatnamala (1039) are a few examples.

Bhaskarabhatta Borikar of the Mahanubhava sect is the first known poet to have composed hymns in Marathi.

Dnyaneshwar (1275–1296) was the first Marathi literary figure who had wide readership and profound influence. His major works are Amrutanubhav and Bhavarth Deepika (popularly known as Dnyaneshwari). Bhavarth Deepika is a 9000-couplets long commentary on the Bhagavad Gita.

Namdev, the Bhakti saint and contemporary of Dnyaneshwar is the other significant literary figure from this era. Namdev composed religious songs in Marathi as well as Hindi; some of his Hindi compositions are included in the Sikh holy book, the Guru Granth Sahib.

Another early Marathi writer was Mukundaraja, who wrote Vivekasindhu and Paramamrita. Both the works deal with the Advaita philosophy. Some earlier scholars dated him to the 12th century, and considered Vivekasindhu as the first literary book in Marathi, dating it to 1188. However, most linguistic historians now date Mukundaraja to 14th century or later: the Vivekasindhu was likely written after Lilacharita and Dnyaneshwari.

=== Deccan Sultanates period ===
There was relatively little activity in Marathi in the early days of the Bahmani Sultanate (1347–1527) and the Bijapur Sultanate (1527–1686). The Warkari saint-poet Eknath (1533–1599), the main successor of Dnyaneshwar, was a major Marathi literary figure during this period. He made available an authentic, edited version of Dnyaneshwari, which had been forgotten after the Islamic invasion of Deccan. He also wrote several abhangs (devotional poems), narratives and minor works that dealt with the Bhagavata Purana He wrote Eknathi Bhagwat, Bhavarth Ramayan, Rukmini Swayamwar Hastamalak, and Bharud. Dasopant was another minor but notable poet from this era. Mukteshwar (1574-1645), the grandson of Eknath, too, wrote several works in Marathi including a partial translation of the epic Mahabharata while the complete verse translation was done by Vishnudas Nama in the late 16th and early 17th century.

Krista Purana, written by the Goa-based Christian missionary Thomas Stephens, was first published in 1616. It is written in a mix of Marathi and Konkani languages, and the first copy was printed in the Roman script, and tells the story of Jesus Christ.

=== Maratha period ===
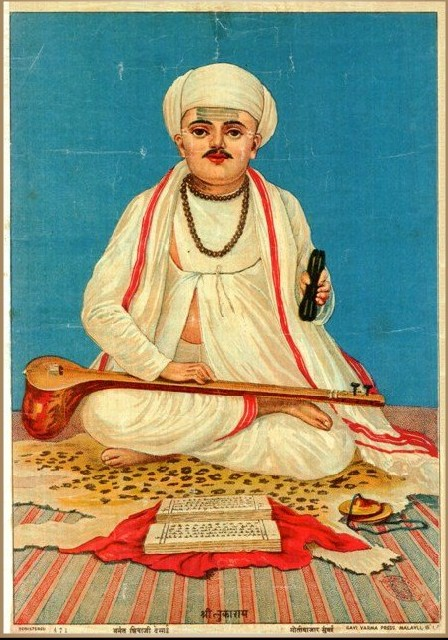
Tukaram

The Marathas, the Marathi-speaking natives, formed their own kingdom under the leadership of Shivaji Maharaj in the 17th century. The development of the Marathi literature accelerated during this period. Tukaram and Samarth Ramdas, who were contemporaries of Shivaji, were the well-known poets of the early Maratha period. Tukaram (1608–1650) was the most prominent Marathi Varkari spiritual poet identified with the Bhakti movement, and had a great influence on the later Maratha society. His contemporary, Samarth Ramdas composed Dasbodh and Manache Shlok in Marathi.

In the 18th century, several well-known works like Yatharthadeepika (by Vaman Pandit), Naladamayanti Swayamvara (by Raghunath Pandit), Pandava Pratap, Harivijay, Ramvijay (by Shridhar Pandit) and Mahabharata (translation by Moropant) were produced. The historical section of the old Marathi literature contained the Bakhars and the Katavas. Krishna Dayarnava and Sridhar were other leading poets during the Peshwa rule. Mahipati, the author who wrote the biographies of the Bhakti Saints also belonged to this era.

=== British Period ===
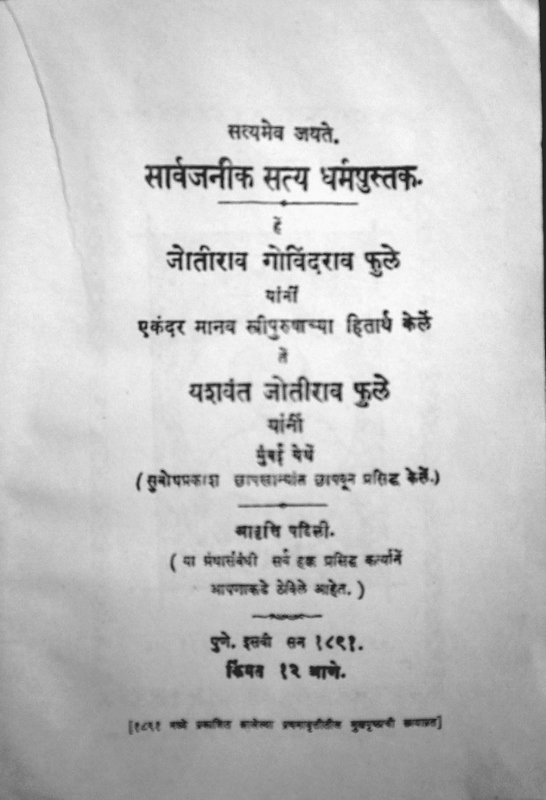
Front page of the book Sarvajanik Satya Dharma Pustak by Jyotiba Phule.

The British colonial period saw standardisation of Marathi grammar through the efforts of the Christian missionary William Carey. Carey's dictionary had fewer entries and Marathi words were in Devanagari script instead of the Modi script prevalent at that time. Carey also translated the new and old testament of the bible into Marathi in 1811 and 1820 respectively. The most comprehensive Marathi-English dictionaries was compiled by Captain James Thomas Molesworth and Major Thomas Candy in 1831. The book is still in print nearly two centuries after its publication. The colonial authorities also worked on standardizing Marathi under the leadership of Molesworth. They used Brahmins of Pune for this task and adopted the Sanskrit dominated dialect spoken by this caste in the city as the standard dialect for Marathi. The Christian missionaries introduced the Western forms to the Marathi literature. (Note: According to Hartmut Scharte, Professor Emeritus of Sanskrit, University of California, Los Angeles, USA vide his book "A History of Indian Literature - Grammatical Literature", the author of the first Marathi Grammar was Venkata Madhava, who was a lecturer in Fort St. George College, Madras (now Chennai). Venkata Madhava's three works on Marathi (as was spoken by the then large Maratha colony of Tanjore) exist only in the autographs of the author or his assistant Bhima Pandita. His Marathi Grammar book "महाराष्ट्र प्रयोग चंद्रिका" was written cir. 1827. It has 227 sutras in Samskrt and is accompanied by a Samskrt commentary, a Marathi commentary and Marathi illustrations. The Samskrt section is written in Devnagari script and the Marathi in Modi script. The grammar which generally follows the Siddhanta Kaumudi in its design, was probably meant to introduce Marathi to the neighbouring Tamil speakers.)

Marathi at this time was efficiently aided by Marathi Drama. Here, there also was a different genre called 'Sangit Natya' or Musicals. The first play was V.A. Bhave's Sita Swayamvar in 1843. Later Kirloskar (1843–85) and G.B. Deval (1854-1916) brought a romantic aroma and social content. But Krishnaji Prabhakar Khadilkar (1872-1948) with his banned play Kichaka-Vadh (1910) set the trend of political playwriting. These were followed by stalwarts like Ram Ganesh Gadkari, Prahlad Keshav Atre. The plays based on historical events linked with Maratha Empire begin with Bashir Momin Kavathekar's popular drama's 'Bhangale Swapna Maharashtra' & 'Vedat Marathe Veer Daudale Saat' which hit the theater in 1970s and then came epic 'Janata Raja' from Babasaheb Purandare in 1980s.

The modern poets like Keshavsuta, Balakavi, Govindagraj, and the poets of Ravi Kiran Mandal (such as Madhav Julian) wrote poetry which was influenced by the Romantic and Victorian English poetry. It was largely sentimental and lyrical. Prahlad Keshav Atre, the renowned satirist and a politician wrote a parody of this sort of poetry in his collection Jhenduchi Phule.

Sane Guruji (1899–1950) contributed to the children's literature in Marathi. His major works are Shyamchi Aai, AstikandGode Shevata. He translated and simplified many Western Classics and published them in a book of stories titled Gode Goshti (Sweet Stories).

=== Beginning of journalism ===
On January 6, 1832, Balshastri Jambhekar of the Elphinstone College began Darpan, the first Marathi-English fortnightly magazine.

On 24 October 1841, Govind Vithal Kunte began Prabhakar. Kunte was the first professional Marathi journalist. Prabhakar eulogised Indian art and culture. American missionaries started a Marathi magazine called Dnyanodaya in 1842 which denigrated Hindu religion but also had articles related to science and technology. The magazine is still in print today. Jnyan Prakash was started on 12 February 1849 in Pune. In its early years, It was edited by Krishnaraj Trimbak Ranade. It was published weekly till 1904, when it became a daily. It ceased publication in 1951.The journal advocated education and social reform. Hari Narayan Apte, a popular Marathi novelist also served as its editor. Some of its contributors included Mahadev Govind Ranade and Gopal Krishna Gokhale.In 1862, Induprakash, a bilingual journal, was founded in Bombay. It was edited by M.G. Ranade. It criticised orthodoxy in Hinduism and called for social reforms. In 1877, Jyotiba Phule and Krishnarao Bhaskar began Deenbandhu, as part of the Dalit upliftment movement. Deenabandhu was the organ of the Satyashodhak Samaj founded by Phule. Other notable early Marathi periodicals include Jaganmitra (from Ratnagiri), Shubh Suchak (from Satara), Vartaman Dipika, and Vartaman Sangrah.

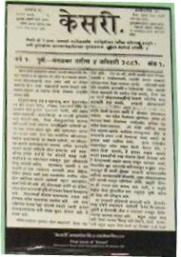
Kesari

On 4 January 1881, Bal Gangadhar Tilak began Kesari, along with Gopal Ganesh Agarkar. In 1887, Agarkar left to start sujeet Sudharak (bilingual) along with Gopal Krishna Gokhale. After Agarkar's death in 1895, it ceased publication. In 1889, K. Navalkar started the weekly Vartahar to highlight atrocities committed by the ruling British and other Europeans. In 1890, Hari Narayan Apte began Karmanuk, a family entertainment paper. It contained articles on science. Also in 1890, Anandrao Ramachandra Dharandhar started Bhoot published every new and full moon day. It was the first Marathi paper to carry cartoons on political and social matters. It was very popular but ceased publication in 1904.

== Present times (1947- till now) ==
Vishnu Sakharam Khandekar (1889–1976)'s Yayati won him the Jnanpith Award for 1975. He also wrote many other novels, short stories, essays etc. His major works are Don Dhruv (Two Poles), Ulka (Meteorite), Krounchavadh, Jalalela Mohar, Amrutvel.

Marathi drama flourished in the 1960s and 1970s, with literary figures like Vasant Kanetkar, Kusumagraj and Vijay Tendulkar.

The major paradigm shift in Marathi literature sensibilities began in the forties with the modernist poetry of B.S. Mardhekar. In the mid fifties, the little magazine movement gained momentum. It published writings which were non-conformist, radical and experimental. Dalit literary movement also gained strength due to the little magazine movement. This radical movement was influenced by the philosophy of B. R. Ambedkar and challenged the literary establishment which was largely middle class, urban, and upper caste people. The little magazine movement threw up many noted writers. Bhalchandra Nemade is a well-known novelist, critic and poet. Sharad Rane is a well-known child literary figure. The notable poets include Arun Kolatkar, Dilip Chitre, Namdeo Dhasal, Vasant Abaji Dahake and Manohar Shankar Oak. Bhau Padhye, Vilas Sarang, Shyam Manohar, Suhas Shirvalkar and Vishram Bedekar are well known fiction writers.

During this period, Maharashtra's traditional form of theatre 'Tamasha' saw rise of Bashir Momin Kavathekar, a prominent poet & writer who wrote Lavani & Vag-Natya for entertainment of rural masses. However, his folk songs on the prevailing social issues like dowry, female foeticide, alcohol addiction, superstition helped in increased social awareness whereas his short-plays, street-plays promoted government initiatives towards sanitation, literacy, water conservation missions.

Another major shift sensibility began in the nineties with the poems and criticism of Shridhar Tilve and the poetry of poets associated with Saushthav, Abhidhanantar and Shabadavedh. In the post nineties, this 'new little magazine movement' gained momentum and poets like Shridhar Tilve who stood against postmodernism and nativism and poets like Manya Joshi, Hemant Divate, Sachin Ketkar, Mangesh Narayanrao Kale, Saleel Wagh, Mohan Borse, Nitin Kulkarni, Nitin Arun Kulkarni, Varjesh Solanki, Sandeep Deshpande, Vasant Gurjar who touched the new areas of post-modern life. The poetry collections brought out by Abhidhanantar Prakashan, Time and Space, Popular Prakashan, Navta Prakashan and the regular issues of the magazine Abhidhanantar and IRREGULAR issues of Saushthav, Shabdvedh are taking Marathi poetry to the global standards. Another leading wave in contemporary Marathi poetry is the poetry of new dalit wave poets like Arun Kale, Bhujang Meshram and new deshi wave poets like Pravin Bandekar, Shrikant Deshmukh and Veerdhaval Parab.

=== Science fiction ===
Marathi science fiction has a rich heritage and a wide enthusiastic readership. In the early 20th century, Marathi science fiction work was more aligned to fantasy. After 1950, several writers started translating classic English science fiction literature and also contributed independent work.

The modern Marathi science fiction took off after technology started playing a major role in providing a rich context for speculating about the future. From 1975, modern Marathi science fiction has been regularly published in mainstream magazines and also in publications devoted to science and technology.

Marathi Vidnyan Parishad has been consistently at the forefront for modern Marathi science fiction, contributing through multiple channels – publications, translations, critique, writing workshops, and its annual science fiction competition. Many modern writers have emerged from this prestigious competition running uninterrupted since 1970. The first wave of writers includes B R Bhagwat, D P Khambete, Narayan Dharap, D B Mokhashi, Gajanan Kshirsagar, and Yashawant Ranjankar. The modern writers are: Jayant Narlikar, Bal Phondke, Niranajan Ghate, Lakshman Londhe, Subodh Jawdekar, Arun Mande, Madhuri Shanbhag, Shubhada Gogate, Sanjay Dhole, D V Kulkarni, Arun Sadhu, Meghashri Dalvi, Sudha Risbud, Smita Potnis, Prasanna Karandikar, Ashish Mahabal, D V Jahagirdar, Yashawant Deshpande.

=== Encyclopedia ===
Since the 20th century, a number of encyclopedias have been produced in Marathi. These include Shridhar Venkatesh Ketkar's Dnyaankosh, Siddheshwarshastri Chitrao's Charitra Kosh, Mahadevshastri Joshi's Bharatiy Sanskrutikosh, and Lakshman Shastri Joshi's Dharmakosh and Marathi Vishwakosh.

=== Dalit Literature ===
It was in 1958, that the term "Dalit literature" was used for the first time, when the first conference of Maharashtra Dalit Sahitya Sangha (Maharashtra Dalit Literature Society) was held at Mumbai, a movement inspired by 19th century social reformer, Jyotirao Phule and eminent dalit leader, B. R. Ambedkar.

Baburao Bagul (1930–2008) was a pioneer of Dalit writings in Marathi. His first collection of stories, Jevha Mi Jat Chorali (जेव्हा मी जात चोरली) (When I Concealed My Caste), published in 1963, created a stir in Marathi literature with its passionate depiction of a cruel society and thus brought in new momentum to Dalit literature in Marathi. Gradually with other writers like, Namdeo Dhasal (who founded Dalit Panthers), these Dalit writings paved way for the strengthening of Dalit movement. Notable Dalit authors writing in Marathi include Arun Krushnaji Kamble, Shantabai Kamble, Raja Dhale, Namdeo Dhasal, Dagdu Maruti Pawar, Annabhau Sathe, Laxman Mane, Laxman Gaikwad, Sharankumar Limbale, Bhau Panchbhai, Kishor Shantabai Kale, Narendra Jadhav, and Urmila Pawar.

== Awards ==
Four Marathi writers have been honored with the Jnanpith Award:

- Vishnu Sakharam Khandekar
- Vishnu Vaman Shirwadkar (Kusumagraj)
- Vinda Karandikar
- Bhalchandra Nemade

Every year, Sahitya Akademi gives the Sahitya Akademi Award to Marathi writers for their outstanding contribution to Marathi literature. See the List of Sahitya Akademi Award winners for Marathi.

== See also ==
- Geet Ramayan
- Marathi people
- Marathi Christians
- Marathi Buddhists
- List of Marathi-language authors
