= Little magazine movement =

The little magazine movement originated in the 1950s and 1960s in many Indian languages like Bengali, Tamil, Marathi, Hindi, Malayalam, Assamese and Gujarati, in the early part of the 20th century.

== Gujarati Little Magazines ==
It is difficult to determine exact number but it can be estimated that during 1950s and 1980s there emereged nearly 100 little magazines in Gujarati from highly influential ones like Kshitij by Suresh Joshi and Re (Zreaygh) by Labhshankar Thaker and others to lesser-known Dalit little magazines like Aakrosh by Neerav Patel and Evolution of Dalit literature and women's literature can be credited to the Little Magazine Movements.

== Little magazine movement in Marathi ==
=== Little magazines of 1955 to 1975 ===
The avant-garde modernist poetry burst upon the Marathi literary world with the poetry of B. S. Mardhekar in the mid-forties. The period 1955–1975 in Marathi literature is dominated by the little magazine movement. It ushered in modernism and the Dalit Literature movement. In the mid-1950s, Dilip Chitre, Arun Kolatkar and their friends started a cyclostyled Shabda. The little magazine movement began to spread with hundreds of ephemeral to relatively longer lasting magazines including Aso, Vacha, Lru, Bharud and Rucha. The movement brought forth a new generation of writers who were dissatisfied with the Marathi literary establishment which they saw as bourgeois, upper caste and orthodox. Ashok Shahane was the pioneer of the little magazine movement in Marathi in the 1960s. The writers such as Dilip Chitre, Arun Kolatkar, Namdeo Dhasal, Tulsi Parab, Bhalchandra Nemade, Manohar Oak, Bhau Padhye, Vilas Sarang and Vasant Abaji Dahake came to prominence with the movement. Their writing is non-conformist and non-populist. The little magazine movement of the 1960s ran out of steam in the mid-1970s. A representative translation of many poets of this period has been done by Dilip Chitre.

=== Little magazines of the 1990s and 2000s ===
The economic reforms of the nineties in India ushered in an era of liberalization, privatization and globalization in Indian society. The boom in the telecommunications sector, cable and satellite television and digital revolution came in tandem with these economic reforms and deeply affected Indian society and culture. Mumbai, being the economic capital of India, felt the overwhelming force of these dramatic changes. Little magazines resurfaced in this period. Abhidhanantar, Shabdavedk, Saushthav and later on Aivaji, Khel, Anaghrat, and Navakshar Darshan burst upon the scene. The poets such as Manya Joshi, Mangesh Narayanrao Kale, Hemant Divate, Sanjeev Khandekar, Saleel Wagh and Sachin Ketkar who emerged from these little magazines of the 1990s bear witness to the social and cultural transformation, writing with a sensibility that is different from the generation that emerged from the movement of the 1960.

== Little Magazine in Assam ==
In Assam, as in other regions, little magazines have played a pivotal role in nurturing literary talent and amplifying new voices. A landmark in this movement was the launch of Bindu in April 1970—the first micro-mini Assamese magazine—edited by the legendary musician, filmmaker, and writer Bhupen Hazarika. Following this, progressive publications like Naxa and Asomiya Kabita emerged, edited under pseudonyms by Pabitra Kumar Deka and Nitya Bora, respectively. Another magazine called Jinti edited by Putul Hazarika was also published in the same time. In recent years, the tradition continues with Tora, a micro-mini magazine edited and published by journalist Ujjal Kumar Das.

== Bengali little magazine movement ==
=== Early 20th century ===
In Bengali literature, it started with Kallol, a modernist movement magazine, established in 1923. The most popular among the group were Kazi Nazrul Islam (1899–1976), Mohitlal Majumder (1888–1952), Achintyakumar Sengupta (1903–1976), Satyendranath Dutta (1882–1922), and Premendra Mitra (1904–1988). Then Bengali poetry got into the brightest light of modernism in the 1930s, through the movement of a few other little magazines, such as Buddhadeb Basu's Kabita and Sudhindranath Datta's Parichay.

=== Taputtap ===
This magazine is based on the widely circulated literature, education, culture and social news of India and the state of West Bengal Asansol. It has been published since 1978.

=== Krittibas ===
Krittibas first appeared in Kolkata in 1953. It played a highly influential role in the Kolkata literary scene in the decades after Indian independence, and provided a platform for young, experimental poets, many of whom went on to become luminaries of modern Bengali poetry.

The editors of the inaugural issue in July 1953 were Sunil Gangopadhyay, Ananda Bagchi and Dipak Mazumdar. Gangopadhyay later became sole editor, and indeed it is his name that is most closely associated with the magazine. Others who also edited the magazine at one point or another included Shakti Chattopadhyay, Sarat Kumar Mukhopadhyay and Samarendra Sengupta. The Phanishwarnath Renu issue of the magazine was edited by Samir Roychoudhury. During 1961-65 several poets left the magazine and joined the Hungryalist Movement.

=== Hungry Generation and anti-establishment movements ===
The little magazine explosion in West Bengal took place after 1961 when the Hungry Generation Movement took the cultural establishment by storm. In fact it changed not only the types of publication but also the naming of magazines. The Hungry Generation Movement aimed at waging a war against the literary establishment and the decadent society in general. Prominent figures included Binoy Mazumdar, Saileswar Ghosh, Malay Roy Choudhury, Subimal Basak, Tridib Mitra, Samir Roychoudhury, Falguni Roy, Subo Acharjo, Pradip Choudhuri, Subhas Ghosh, Basudeb Dasgupta, Sandipan Chattopadhyay, Shakti Chattopadhyay. Utpalkumar Basu, Rabindra Guha, Arunesh Ghosh, Raja Sarkar, Aloke Goswami, Selim Mustafa, Arup Datta, Rasaraj Nath, Rabiul and many others..

There are other Bengali Writers who raised their voice against the establishment but did not join the Hungry generation Movement. Most notable among them is the Subimal Mishra. Other experimental writers who mostly wrote in little magazines include Kamal Kumar Majumdar, Amiyabhushan Majumdar and Udayan Ghosh.

=== 'Kaurab' cult ===
Some major changes occurred in the 1970s in the Bengali little magazine movement, chiefly around Kaurab, a literary and cultural magazine nearly four decades old. Prime cult-figures of Kaurab are: Swadesh Sen, Kamal Chakraborty (original editor), Barin Ghosal, Debajyoti Dutta, Pranabkumar Chattopadhyay, Shankar Lahiri, Sidhartha Basu, Shankar Chakraborty and Aryanil Mukhopadhyay (present editor). In international scenario Bengali poetry has been represented by Kaurab poets like Subhro Bandopadhyay, (present assistant editor).

=== Zero boundary poetry ===
Zero boundary is a conceptual field that supports the coverage of postmodernism state and supports the thought of boundarylessness in poetic field. In 2018 bengali poet Afzal Ali of Kabita Pakkhik independently established an association and since then a magazine has been published regularly called ' zero oundary kabita' patrika . Young generation poets are associated with this magazine. The name of magazine comes from his 'Zero boundary concept'.

=== New Poetry (Natun Kabita) ===
Since the mid-1980s Bengali literature experienced a new genre of Bengali poetry called New Poetry. From the early 1990s with impetus from a Kolkata-based poetry journal Kabita Campus, New Poetry has begun to gain immense acclaim from the young contemporary poets of Bengal. In 2003 some poets of this genre have started a journal named Natun Kabita containing their ideas and poems, through both online and print media. Poets who joined this movement in the mid-1990s are: Barin Ghosal, Ranjan Moitro, Swapan Roy, Dhiman Chakraborty, Alok Biswas, Pronob Pal, Saumitra Sengupta, Rajarshi Chattopadhyay, Shamik Joy Sengupta, Atanu Bandopadhyay, Rajatendra Mukhopadhay, Pradip Chakraborty.

=== Little magazines culture of Basirhat ===
Basirhat is widely known as the hub of little magazines. Many publication agencies publish their books and little magazines every year on the day of Mahalaya, which is known as the first day of durga puja. Every book features local and national articles, literature and art, which usually focus on bengali literature. Dated back to a thousand years ago, Basirhat is one of the oldest hub of little magazines in India. Currently Basirhat and surrounding areas has more than 100 publications.

=== Little Magazine Library and Research Centre ===
There is a Little Magazine Library and Research Centre at 9, Tamer Lane (run by Sandip Dutta since 1978), Kolkata-700009, India, which collects Bengali little magazines published anywhere in the world.

=== Midnapore Little Magazine Library ===
Midnapore Little Magazine Library – A digital library for little magazines of East and West Medinipur district. Information about more than 600 little magazines published from Medinipur District, from the year 1870 to now.

=== Sahitya Academy ===
The Sahitya Akademi (Indian Academy of Letters) also publishes two literary journals, namely Indian Literature in English and Samkalin Bhartiya Sahitya in Hindi. However they cannot be considered as "little magazines" as they have state support and appear regularly. A prime example of this continuing tradition is The Little Magazine, published from New Delhi since May 2000., Civil Lines and Yatra

=== Grasshoppers ===
In January 2014, little magazine movement got a new way to spread their voice. Arunava Chatterjee, a Kolkata-based IT Entrepreneur and writer, formed Grasshoppers! - the first ever e-Commerce website for selling little magazines online along with one of the most eminent magazine Ekak Matra. It is already actively spreading in different areas across the world with a strong delivery backbone.

== Little magazine movement in Indian English Literature ==
- Indian Literature (journal) - It is official English Language literary journal published bi-monthly by the Sahitya Akademi .
- Kavya Bharati - An annual journal, The Study Centre for Indian Literature in English and Translation
- Coldnoon: Travel Poetics - International Journal of Travel Writing

== Little magazines in India ==
- Abhidhanantar-Marathi little magazine
- Drighangchoo
- Kaurab
- Saptoparno (2008)
- Haptak Kachra
- Kledajakusum

== Literary Bengali little magazines in Bangladesh ==
- Shankhachil (since 2015; edited by Mafuz Pathok) & Iqbal Mahfuz)
