= Marathi poetry =

Poetry in the Marathi culture

Marathi poetry is a poetry written in the Marathi language, including its various dialects.

The poet-saints Namdev (Devanagari: नामदेव) and Dnyaneshwar (Devanagari: ज्ञानेश्वर), from Maharashtra, India, wrote the earliest significant religious poetry in Marathi. They were born in 1270 and 1275, respectively. Namdev wrote more than 400 verses in the abhang (अभंग) form. Dnyaneshwar composed his poetry in the owi (ओवी) form. His compositions, Dnyaneshwari (ज्ञानेश्वरी) and Amrutanubhawa (अमृतानुभव), consist of 9,037 and about 800 owis, respectively.

== 16th to 18th century ==
Eknath (एकनाथ, 1533–1599) was the next prominent Marathi poet.

Prominent poets from the 17th century include Tukaram, Mukteshwar, Ramdas, Vaman Pandit, Raghunath Pandit and Shridhar Pandit.

In the 17th century, Raghunath Sesa (also known as Raghunath Pandit) marked an important stage in the evolution of Marathi literature, associated with the Pant-Sahitya tradition, where religious and mythological themes were expressed using heavily Sanskritized vocabulary and complex poetic structures. His most renowned composition, Nal-Damayanti Swayamwar Akhyan, is a narrative poem inspired by the classical love story from Sanskrit epics and stands as a fine example of the Pant-Sahitya tradition.

Moropant was a prominent poet of the 18th century. His Aryabhaarata (आर्याभारत) was the first epic in Marathi.

== 19th century ==
Early 19th-century Marathi poetry consisted of powada (पोवाडे) ballads, phatake (फटके), and lavani (लावणी), which were composed by tantakavi (तंतकवि) or shahir (शाहीर). Prominent poets included Parasharam (परशराम), Honaji Bala (होनाजी बाळा), Anantaphandi (अनंतफंदी), Ram Joshi (रामजोशी), and Prabhakar (प्रभाकर).

The work of mid-19th-century Marathi poets such as Krushnashastri Chiplunkar (कृष्णशास्त्री चिपळूणकर), Kunte (कुंटे), Lembhe (लेंभे), and Mogare (मोगरे) showed influences from both Sanskrit and English poetry.

In the late 19th century, Keshavasuta and Rev Tilak Narayan Waman Tilak (रेव्हरंड टिळक) produced poems influenced by English poets such as Wordsworth and Tennyson. They extended the horizon of Marathi poetry to encompass beauty in nature, love, romance, and mysticism as subjects.

== 20th century ==
Modern Marathi poetry began with Mahatma Jyotiba Phule's compositions. Later poets like Keshavsuta, Balakavi, Govindagraj, and the poets of Ravi Kiran Mandal, like Madhav Julian, wrote poetry that was influenced by Romantic and Victorian English poetry, being largely sentimental and lyrical. Prahlad Keshav Atre, a renowned satirist and politician, wrote a parody of this sort of poetry in his collection, Jhenduchi Phule.

The major paradigm shift in sensibility began in the 1940s with the avant-garde modernist poetry of BS Mardhekar. V. V. Shirwādkar, also known by his nom de plume Kusumagraj is considered to be one of the most important poets in the history of Marathi poetry. In the mid-1950s, the "little magazine movement" gained momentum. It published writings which were non-conformist, radical and experimental. It also strengthened the Dalit literary movement, and in general many poets emerged from the "little magazine movement".

A major change in Marathi sensibility began in the 1990s with the antipostmodern criticism and postpostmodern poems of Shridhar Tilve. Shridhar Tilve brought to attention how the post-sixty generation is outdated, in his article "Chauta Shodh". His first collection of poems (Eka Bhartiya Vidyarthache Udgar) was published in 1991 by Popular Prakashan.

A "new little magazine movement" gained momentum and poets like (Shridhar Tilve) Manya Joshi, Hemant Divate, Sachin Ketkar, Mangesh Narayanrao Kale, Saleel Wagh, Mohan Borse, Nitin Kulkarni, Nitin Arun Kulkarni, Varjesh Solanki, Sandeep Deshpande, Prafull Shiledar, Nitin Wagh and Dnyanda emerged. Publishers include Abhidhanantar Prakashan, Popular Prakashan and Granthali Prakashan.

Other 20th-century poets include Mangesh Padgaonkar, Bhalchandra Nemade, Arun Kolatkar, Dilip Chitre, Namdeo Dhasal, Vasant Abaji Dahake and Manohar Oak.

A new wave in contemporary Marathi poetry is the poetry of non-urban poets such as Arun Kale, Bhujang Meshram, Pravin Bandekar, Sandip Desai (संदीप देसाई) and Avinash Chavan (अविनाश चव्हाण).

== See also ==
- Marathi Literature
