= Abhidhanantar =

Indian literary magazine in the Marathi language

Abhidhanantar was a literary magazine in the Marathi language primarily devoted to poetry. It was edited by Hemant Divate, a noted Marathi poet and publisher. It started as a little magazine called Abhidha in 1992 and in 1998 it was named Abhidhanantar because of registration issues. It was discontinued in 2009. Abhidhanantar, along with periodicals like Shabdavedh, Saushthav, Khel and Navakshar Darshan was in the tradition of the famous `little magazine movement’ in Marathi poetry pioneered by renowned poets like Dilip Chitre and Arun Kolatkar in the 1950s. The focus of this periodical was on the relationship between literature and globalization and it showcased the poetry which emerged from the social, cultural and linguistic crises brought about by globalization. Abhidhanantar was also honoured with the Maharashtra Foundation Award for its contributions to Marathi literature.

Its significance lies in the fact that it provided a platform for poets from various social, cultural and geographical locations eager to produce original poetry for more than seventeen years. It also brought out important special issues like the Dilip Chitre special issue, the Arun Kolatkar special issue and a special issue on Globalization and Marathi poetry. Many new poets and critics like Saleel Wagh, Sachin Ketkar, Manya Joshi, Sanjeev Khandekar, Mangesh Narayanrao Kale, besides Hemant himself, have published their significant work in this magazine.
