= Ravikiran Mandal =

Ravikiran Mandal was a group of Marathi poets established in Pune in 1923. Originating around 1920 to introduce new forms to poetry creation and recitation, the circle aimed to popularize Marathi poetry among ordinary readers and listeners.

== History and founding ==
The group originated from informal weekly gatherings known as the "Sun-T-Club" (Sunday Tea Club), held every Sunday at a member's house to read, sing, and discuss poetry. This routine eventually evolved into the Ravikiran Mandal, which was officially founded in 1923.

At the time of its inception, the circle consisted of eight members, namely Sreedhar Balakrishna Ranade (1892–1984), Manoramabai Ranade (1896–1926), Madhav Julian (1894–1939), Yashwant Dinkar Pendharkar (1899–1985), Girish (1893–1963), G. T. Madkholkar (1899–1976), D. L. Gokhale and Diwakar (1889–1931). After Diwakar left the circle, Vithal Dattatray Ghate (1895–1978) joined in his place. Because the group consisted of seven men and one woman (Manoramabai Ranade), they adopted the official symbol of Arundhati-vangda Saptarshi ("Arundhati along with the Seven Sages"), which was printed on the group's publications.

== Literary style and characteristics ==
The members of Ravikiran Mandal built upon the tradition established by Keshavsut, making it bolder over time. The group advocated for individual liberty and social reform, expressing love directly and candidly (including platonic or incorporeal love (ashaririya)) rather than relying on traditional allegorical frames like Radhakrishna.

The group expanded the reach of Marathi poetry to the general public outside elite poetic circles, largely supported by the practice of singing poetry (kavyagayana). They engaged in collaborative poetry composition and introduced several stylistic innovations:

- Sonnets (Sunit): They established the practice of writing sonnets in Marathi using various metrical meters (vritta) and woven story threads.
- Lyric poetry (Bhavgeet): Independent lyric poems were adapted into story-driven narrative epics (khandakavya).
- Ghazals and folk songs: They popularized folk-style poetry (janpadgeet) and introduced ghazals to Marathi literature.
- Social narrative poetry: Members wrote both short and complete long social narrative poems.

== Prominent members and contributions ==
=== Madhav Julian ===
Madhav Julian was the most central figure in the Mandal, combining poetic creation with scholarly expertise. He is credited with establishing the ghazal genre in Marathi poetry. Historically, his experimental approach serves as a bridge between Keshavsut and B. S. Mardhekar. His key works include Madhumadhav (1924), a joint poetry collection co-authored with V. D. Ghate; and Chhandorachana (1927, 1937), a scholarly treatise on prosody.

=== Yashwant ===
Yashwant Dinkar Pendharkar was the most popular poet among the public within the Mandal. His work focused on emotional intensity (bhavotkatata) and the feelings of ordinary domestic life rather than poetic trickery. He experimented extensively with sonnets.

=== Girish ===
Girish wrote both short lyrical poems and long narrative epics marked by emotional restraint and musical quality. His short poems frequently touched on social themes, expressing sympathy for widows, abandoned women, and poor students, as well as nature and music. His works include:

- Short poetry collections: Kanchan Ganga (1930), Phalabhar (1934), Manasmedh (1943), Kanchanmegh (1955), and Soneri Chandne (1961).
- Long narrative epics: Abhagi Kamal (1923), Kala (1926), and Aamrai (1928).

=== Other members ===
Other members included:

- V. D. Ghate: Gradually transitioned from poetry to prose during his active years. His prose works include educational books such as Natyaroop Maharashtra (1926) and Nana Deshatil Nana Lok (1933), the character sketch collection Kahi Mhatare V Ek Mhatari (1939), and his autobiography Divas Ase Hote (1961).
- Diwakar: Achieved renown for writing dramatic monologues (Natyachhatas).
- G. T. Madkholkar: Gained prominence as a journalist, novelist, and literary critic.
- S. B. Ranade, Manoramabai Ranade, and D. L. Gokhale: Contributed smaller bodies of poetry to the collective output.

== Publications ==
The Mandal issued joint publications bearing the group's name and the Saptarshi emblem:

- Kiran (1923) – The group's first prose-poetry book, which included Diwakar's Natyachhatas.
- Kavyavichar (1924) – A published collection of critical essays detailing the group's thoughts on poetry.
- Usha (1924) – Poetry collection.
- Madhumadhav (1924) – Joint poetry collection by Madhav Julian and V. D. Ghate.
- Shalaka (1925) – Poetry collection.
- Prabha (1927) – Poetry collection.

== Legacy and recognition ==
Ravikiran Mandal made valuable contributions to Marathi poetry in both quantity and quality, extending and expanding the Keshavsut tradition. Four of its members—Madhav Julian, Yashwant, G. T. Madkholkar, and V. D. Ghate—were honoured by serving as the President of the All India Marathi Sahitya Sammelan. Through continuous experimentation and dedication to making poetry accessible to common people, the group created a distinct identity in the history of Marathi literature.
