= Gateway LitFest =

CGateway LitFest
- Genre: Literary festival
- Frequency: Annually, Feb–March
- Venue: NCPA
- Locations: Mumbai, Maharashtra
- Country: India
- Years active: 2015–present
- Major events: Interaction sessions, Discussions
- Organiser: Passion 4 Communication & Kaakka, Mumbai
- Website: gatewaylitfest.com

Gateway LitFest or GLF is an annual literary festival held at NCPA (2) in Mumbai. This is the first of the kind event to celebrate the writings and writers in Indian languages. Gateway LitFest has been conceptualised as a national-level platform for the regional language writers to help them share ideas and to facilitate integration of various regional languages into the mainstream literature.

== Origin and founders ==
Gateway LitFest was conceptualised in 2014. The first edition of the literary festival took place in 2015. Mohan Kakanadan, Sabarinath M, Joseph Alexander and KJ Bennychan are the promoters of the festival. The festival is jointly organised by Mumbai-based Malayalam publication `Kaakka’ and communication consultancy Passion 4 Communication Pvt. Ltd, Mumbai.

== Advisory Panel ==
The advisory panel of the fest is headed by Adoor Gopalakrishnan. Other members in the panel are Pratibha Ray, Subodh Sarkar, Sitanshu Yashachandra, Laxman Gaikwad, K Satchidanandan, Sachin Ketkar, S Prasannarajan, Bose Krishnamachari, Uma Da Cunha and C Gouridasan Nair.

== History ==
=== 2015 ===
The first edition was held on 14 and 15 February 2015 at NCPA, Mumbai. The fest focused on seven languages – Bengali, Gujarati, Kannada, Marathi, Malayalam, Odia and Tamil. Around 50 authors from 15 languages attended the festival as speakers. The attendees included Adoor Gopalakrishnan, Laxman Gaikwad, Ravi Subramanian, K Satchidanandan, Sitanshu Yashaschandra, Subodh Sarkar, Leena Manimakalai, Govind Nhalani, Benyamin, Hemant Divatte, Nandita Das, Malika Sheikh, Sachin Ketkar, EV Ramakrishnan, Satish Solankurkar, Kureeppuzha Sreekumar, Kalpetta Narayan, VR Sudhish and Manasi.

=== 2016 ===
The second edition of Gateway Litfest was held at NCPA, Mumbai on 20 and 21 February 2016. Around 70 writers from 15 languages participated in the festival. (18) The theme was `the contemporary regional literature landscape.’ The speakers included Adoor Gopalakrishnan, Pratibha Ray, Sitakant Mahapatra, Sitanshu Yashaschandra, Anand Neelakantan, Ananth Narayan Mahadevan, Anitha Thampi, B.Jeyamohan, Balakrishnan, Binayak Bandyopadhyay, Binita Mallik, Desmond L Kharmawphlang, Gurbir Singh, Hema Naik, Hemant Divate, Ibomcha Yumlembam Singh, Jayant Pawar, Jerry Pinto, Koushiki Dasgupta, K S Raman, K V Maniraj, Leena Manimekalai, Madhavi Narsalay, Madhupal, Maya Rahi, M G Radhakrishnan, Mustansir Dalvi, N S Madhavan, Paresh Mokashi, Pranay Phukan, Purnachandra Hembram, Sachin Ketkar, Salkhu Majhi, Sampurna Chattarji, Sethumadhavan, Shaji Vikraman, Shefalika Verma, Shyam Benegal, S Prasannarajan, Subhash Chandran, Sunil Sukthankar, T K Muralidharan, Udaya Tara Nayar, and Zaman Azurdah.

=== 2017 ===
Third edition, held at NCPA in Mumbai on 25–26 February 2017, was based on the theme: `the contemporary face of Indian Literature.’ The main speakers included Adoor Gopalakrishnan, Anjali Menon, Anju Makhija, Chandana Dutt, Damodar Mauzo, Desmond Kharmawaflang, Desraj Kali, Haladhar Nag, Hemant Divate, KR Meera, Kumar Ketkar, Laxman Gaikwad, M Mukundan, Malika Amar Sheikh, Mangesh Kale, Mihir Chitre, Mini Krishnan, Parichay Dass, Ramesh Suryawanshi, S Prasannarajan, Sachin Ketkar, Salil Wagh, Salma Rukkaiah, Sanjeev Khandekar, Sharankumar Limbale, Shafi Shauq, Thilothama Majumdar and Vasanta Balan.

=== 2018 ===
The main theme of the fourth edition, held on 22, 23 & 24 February 2018 at NCPA in Mumbai was Celebration of Women Power in Indian literature and over 50 women writers were speakers. Around 50 women writers from 17 languages participated in the festival. The names of writers and speakers who attended the festival include

Aparna Sen, Shobhaa De, Anju Makhija, Devika J, Indu Menon, Kanaka Ha, Karthika VK, Nirupama Dutt, Prof. Challapalli Swaroopa Rani, Tarannum Riyaz, Nandita Das, Bina Paul, Baby Haldar, Neena Kulkarni, Nalini Jameela, Nitu Bhattacharya, Patricia Mukhim, Pradnya Daya Pawar, Jacinta Kerketta, Aswathy Sasikumar, Manushi, Nighat Sahiba, Rekha Sachdev Pohani, Mercy Margaret, Anuradha S, Indira Das, Kamal Vora, Malini Nair, Meena Menon, Meenakshi Reddy Madhavan, Prasanna Ramaswamy, Rana Ayyub, Rokeya Roy, Sanskritirani Desai, Sushama Deshpande, Udayan Thakkar, Chandrahas Choudhury, Sanjukta Wagh, Sunil Mehta, Purva Naresh, Kaartikeya Bajpai, Dileep Jhaveri, Dhruv Sharma and Professor Neeti Singh.
