= City of Love =

City of Love may refer to:

== Locations ==
- Agra, India
- Ahwaz, Iran
- Ashgabat, Turkmenistan
- Chełmno, Poland
- Iloilo City, Philippines
- Kırklareli, Türkiye
- Paris, France
- San Francisco, United States
- Santiago de los Caballeros, Dominican Republic
- Tbilisi, Georgia
- Telšiai, Lithuania
- Venice, Italy
- Verona, Italy
- Wellington, New Zealand
- Zonguldak, Türkiye

== Entertainment ==
- City of Love (album), a 2020 album by Deacon Blue
- "City of Love", a 2026 single by Mylene Farmer from Interstellaires
- City of Love (film), a 2023 thriller film by Èric Boadella
- The City of Love, a 2007 novel by Rimi B. Chatterjee
