= Rimi B. Chatterjee =

Indian writer, translator, and professor

- Education: Oxford University (Ph.D)
- Occupations: Professor, author, translator
- Writing career
- Period: Modern, historical
- Genres: Fiction, science fiction, nonfiction, comics

Rimi B. Chatterjee is an Indian writer of science fiction, screenwriter, translator, comics creator and former professor of English literature at Jadavpur University, Kolkata, India. Her first novel Signal Red (later republished as Signal Red Remounted) was published in 2005 by Penguin India, followed by City of Love ( Penguin India 2007) and Black Light (Harper Collins India 2010). She is known for near-future dystopian and climate fiction and historical fantasy. Most of her recent stories are set in the Antisense Universe, a climate-positive alternate future world. She was active in the 2014 Jadavpur University Protests.

In 2024 she won the Short Forms contest by Room magazine for ‘Zigsa Tells Her Story’. In 2023 she won the Utopia Award for best utopian novellette for ‘A Question of Choice’ in Reckoning magazine’s special issue "Our Beautiful Reward'. Her novella "Arisudan' featured on the Locus Reading List for 2021 In 2022 she was a finalist at the Writing Climate Pitchfest, an initiative by the Hollywood Climate Summit.

== Career ==
Chatterjee is a novelist, screenwriter, translator, and ex-professor of English at Jadavpur University. She completed her Ph.D at Oxford University in 1997. She taught at Jadavpur University from 2004 till 2024.

== Selected publications ==
=== Novels ===
- Black Light (2010)
- The City of Love (2007)
- Signal Red (2005)
- Signal Red Remounted

=== Stories ===
- "The Garden of Bombahia", about sixteenth-century scientist and heretic Garcia da Orta, appeared in Wasafiri 24(3): pp. 98–106.
- "The First Rasa", about a woman printer in Calcutta's nineteenth-century pleasure district, came out in Kolkata: Book City: Readings, Fragments, Images, ed. Sria Chatterjee and Jennie Renton (Edinburgh: Textualities, 2009).
- "Jessica", about an Anglo-Indian woman hairdresser of Portuguese descent in a Bengali neighbourhood in Calcutta, came out in Vislumbres: Bridging India and Iberoamerica 1 (2008): pp. 58–9.
- "The Key to All the Worlds", appeared in Superhero: The Fabulous Adventures of Rocket Kumar and Other Indian Superheroes, published by Scholastic India in 2007. ISBN 81-7655-821-4
- "A Night with the Joking Clown". (2019). In Saint, Tarun K. (ed.). The Gollancz Book of South Asian Science Fiction.
- "Arisudan" (Mithila Review #15, 2021)
- "‘Arfabad’, in Multispecies Cities, edited by Christoph Rupprecht, Deborah Cleland, Norie Tamura, Rajat Chaudhuri, Sarena Ulibarri, World Weaver Press, April 2021.
- " ‘Karmic Joy’, Karma Comes Before, the Magazine, Issue 001, January 2022.
- "A Question of Choice", Our Beautiful Reward, Reckoning Special Issue, November 2022.
- "'A Walk in the Park', State of Matter 7, December 2022
- ‘All I Really Wanna Do’, in We Came to Dance: An Anthology for the Victims of Club Q, edited by V. S. Holmes, Amphibian Press, September 2023.
- ‘Hopdog’ in Solarpunk Creatures, World Weaver Press, January 2024.
- ‘The Mudpie’ in Samyukta Fictions, edited by Anupama Mohan, 2024.
- ‘Zigsa Tells Her Story’, Room 47.2, winner, Room short fiction competition 2024.

=== Graphic stories ===
- "How Zigsa Found Her Way" in the Longform Anthology published by HarperCollins India in 2018.
- "Killer" in Comix India Vol. 2: Girl Power in 2010.
- "The Bookshop on the Hill" in Drighangchoo Issue 3, Kolkata 2010.

=== Other books ===
- Empires of the Mind: A History of the Oxford University Press in India During the Raj (2006)
- Apon Katha: My Story by Abanindranath Tagore (translation from Bengali to English) (Chennai: Tara, 2004)
- Titu Mir by Mahasweta Devi (Bhattacharya) (translation from Bengali to English) (Calcutta: Seagull, 2000) ISBN 81-7046-174-X
- Other out-of-print work.

== Honors and awards ==
- 2007 SHARP DeLong Prize for History of the Book (Empires of the Mind: A History of the Oxford University Press in India During the Raj)
- 2007 English Fiction shortlist, Vodafone Crossword Book Award (City of Love)
- 2023 Utopia Award for best utopian novellette for ‘A Question of Choice’ in Reckoning magazine’s special issue "Our Beautiful Reward'.
- 2024 Short Forms contest by Room magazine for ‘Zigsa Tells Her Story’.
