= Yashwant Dinkar Pendharkar =

Indian poet (1899–1985)

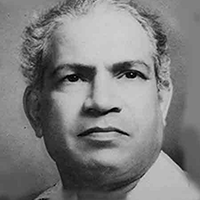
- Born: 9 March 1899; Chaphal, Satara district
- Died: 26 November 1985 (aged 86); Pune, India
- Writing career
- Pen name: Yashwant
- Notable awards: Padma Bhushan

Yashwant Dinkar Pendharkar (9 March 1899 – 26 November 1985) was an Indian Marathi poet from Maharashtra, India. He wrote poetry under the pen name Yashwant. He served as the court poet (Rajkavi) of Baroda State and was honored with the title "Maharashtra-Kavi".

== Early life ==
Yashwant was born on 9 March 1899 in Chaphal, located in the Satara district. He completed his education in Sangli. After passing his matriculation examination, he moved to Pune and took up employment as a clerk. During the early stage of his career, he received guidance on poetic composition from the poet Sadhudas.

== Literary career ==
Yashwant's early poetry was predominantly nationalistic in nature. After associating with the Ravikiran Mandal, his work was influenced by English Romantic poetry. His poetry was characterized as lyrical, emotionally intense, and reflective of the joys and sorrows of common people, making him the most prominent figure within the Ravikiran Mandal.

At the 1921 Marathi Sahitya Sammelan in Baroda, Pendharkar met Madhav Julian and Shridhar Ranade, and the three formed a friendship based on common literary interests. The three lived in Pune and started frequently meeting for literary discussions. Soon Gajanan Tryambak Madkholkar, Shankar Kanetkar (poet Girish), and D. L. Gokhale joined the meetings, and the group eventually identified itself as Ravikiran Mandal. (Viththal Dattatreya Ghate later joined the group.)

Ravikiran Mandal popularised Marathi poetry in Maharashtra during approximately 1922-35 through public poetry recitals by member poets. Pendharkar had both a melodious voice and a talent for presenting his recitals very effectively. (Some of the recitals used to be held in Lokamanya Tilak's Gayakwadwada in Pune under the sponsorship of Tilak's son Shridhar.)

In 1929, Yashwant published his first major and popular poetry collection, Yashodhan. He subsequently published several other collections, including Yashogandha (1934), Yashogiri (1944) and Ojaswini (1946).

In addition to short lyrical poetry, Yashwant composed several long narrative poems:

- Jayamangala (1931) – A romantic narrative depicting the love story of the poet Bilhana, composed of 22 lyrical songs (bhavgeet).
- Bandishala (1932) – A narrative poem detailing the lives of juvenile offenders.
- Kavyakirit (1941) – A descriptive work on the coronation ceremony of Maharaja Pratapsinh of Baroda.

Yashwant also wrote poetry for children, prose works, and an epic poem titled Chhatrapati Shivaray (1968), based on the life of Shivaji. Although he engaged in prose writing, he gained his primary recognition as a poet.

In 1940, Maharaja Pratap Singh Gayakwad of the princely state of Baroda (which was then under British Raj) honored Pendharkar by naming him as Raj Kawi (राजकवि) --state poet. (The previous year, soon after Pratap Singh's accession to the throne following the death of his highly public-spirited grandfather Sayajirao Gayakwad, Pendharkar had composed his epic Kawya Kirit (काव्य-किरीट), which contained a description of the obligations of a princely head of a state toward the subjects. Pratap Singh turned out to be a hedonistic spendthrift who squandered Baroda state's money.)

== Awards and accolades ==
Following the publication of Kavyakirit, Yashwant was appointed as the court poet (Rajkavi) of Baroda State.Upon the creation of Samyukta Maharashtra, he was formally honored with the title "Maharashtra-Kavi".

Yashwant, a recipient of the civilian honour of the Padma Bhushan, presided over Marathi Sahitya Sammelan in Mumbai in 1950.

== Death ==
Yashwant died in Pune on 26 November 1985 at the age of 86.

== Literary work ==
Pendharkar wrote poetry with romantic, social, and nationalistic themes. He also wrote some poetry for children (and three prose books).

The following is a list of collections of Pendharkar's poems and prose writings:

- Yashawantī (1921)
- Tukaram Kamble
- Mahārāshṭra Wīṇājhaṅkār (1922)
- Bhāvamanthan (1930)
- Jaya-Maṅgalā (1931)
- Yashogandha (1935)
- Bandīshāḷā (1939)
- Kāwya Kirīṭ ((काव्य-किरीट)) (1939)
- Yashonidhi (1941)
- Motībāg (Poems for children) (1942)
- Ghāyaḷ (1944)
- Yashogirī (1944)
- Kāntaṇīchẽ Ghar (1945)
- Ojaswinī (1946)
- Yaśhodhan (यशोधन) (1956)
- Pāṇapoī (1956)
- Muthe, Lokamate (मुठे, लोकमाते) (1961)
- Hāpisar (1962)
- Kamaṇḍalu (1962)
- Samartha Rāmdās (1964)
- Chhatrapatī Shiwarāy (1968)
- Raṇadurgā Jhāshīwālī (1977)
