= Comix India =

Indian comics anthology magazine

Comix India was an Indian comics anthology magazine, dedicated to alternative Indian comics for adults. It was begun in 2010 by comics artist Bharath Murthy in collaboration with Kailash Iyer. It was self-published, black & white and followed a print-on-demand, profit-sharing publishing model. It was the name of a self published anthology comics series began in 2010. The magazine focused on long-form stories. It is now a comics publishing label. Vérité, a comics anthology magazine for adults is currently published under the Comix India label. Bharath Murthy is the Editor and Mitsuhiro Asakawa is the Editorial Adviser. Asakawa is a former editor of cult Japanese alternative manga magazines Garo and Ax and gekiga researcher for more than two decades. Alternative Japanese manga features in Vérité alongside Indian comics.

== History ==
In 2009, Bharath put out a call for a new amateur comics magazine on an internet forum on Indian comics that he ran. Among those who responded was Kailash Iyer, who agreed to do the book design. At the time its first volume was released in March 2010, it was among the few such anthologies in India, like Drighangchoo, published between 2009-10 in Kolkata. In an interview with art historian Ryan Holmberg in The Comics Journal, Bharath says he was inspired by doujinshi comics culture that he witnessed in Japan, while filming a documentary on the topic, called The Fragile Heart of Moé.
