= Tutari (poem) =

Marathi-language patriotic poem by Keshavsut

Tutari is a patriotic poem in the Marathi language by Keshavsut. In this poem, Keshavsut calls to fight for independence from the British Raj in India. The poem inspired many Indians to fight to overthrow the British occupation.

== Lyrics ==
Marathi
Translation

एक तुतारी द्या मज आणुनी!
फुंकीन जी मी स्वप्राणाने.
भेदुनी टाकीन सारी गगने!
दीर्घ तिच्या त्या किंकाळीने.

Bring me a trumpet!
I shall fill it with my own breath
I shall pierce all skies!
With its long ringing notes

अशी तुतारी द्या मजलागुनि
जुने जाऊ द्या मरणालागुनि
जाळूनी, किंवा पुरुनी टाका
सडत न एका ठायी ठाका
सावध ऐका पुढल्या हाका

Bring me such a trumpet
Leave the old, let it die
Burn, or bury it
Do not stand in one place and rot
Listen with attention to the next call

खांद्यास चला खांदा भिडवूनी
एक तुतारी द्या मज आणुनी
प्राप्तकाल हा विशाल भूधर
सुंदर लेणी तयात खोदा

Let us walk shoulder to shoulder
Bring me a trumpet
The status quo is a large boulder
Dig a beautiful cave through it

निजनामे त्या वरती नोंदा
बसुनी का वाढविता मेदा
विक्रम काही करा चला तर

Inscribe your own names on it
Why just sit around and grow fat
Get up and accomplish some brave feat

हल्ला करण्या तर दंभावर तर बंडावर
शुरांनो, या त्वरा करा रे
समते चा ध्वज उंच धारा रे
नीती ची द्वाही फिरवा रे
तुतारीच्या या सुरा बरोबर

Attack the fort of hypocrisy
Come, O Braves, make haste
Raise high the flag of equality
Wave the proclamation of moral ideals
Synchronised with these notes of the trumpet
