= Bhau Padhye =

Marathi writer

Prabhakar Narayan alias Bhau Padhye (1926–1996) was an Indian writer who wrote in Marathi. Padhye is regarded as one of the foremost writers to have emerged in not just modern Marathi literature but also Indian literature, at large. Dilip Chitre once commented that Padhye is a writer "who deserves a permanent place in World Literature".

During his lifetime, Padhye had a long and tussled ending with the publication of his books. Nevertheless, his novels Barrister Aniruddha Dhopeshvarkar, Vasunaka, and Rada are regarded as classics of modern Marathi literature. Padhye was also known for his short stories. A collection of his short stories was edited by Dilip Chitre. Another collection of his selected short stories was edited by Rajan Gavas.

His third published novel Vasunaka (Devanagari: वासूनाका) polarized critics in Maharashtra. Writers including Vijay Tendulkar, Durga Bhagwat hailed the novel for its originality and its portrayal of humanism. On the other hand, critics like Acharya Atre shamed the novel for its vulgarity.

Padhye graduated in Economics from the University of Mumbai in 1948. During 1949-51, he worked as a full-time volunteer for a labour union. He worked next as a teacher in King George High School at Dadar, L. Kaduri High School at Mazgaon, and B. S. Ezikel High School at Sandhurst Road, all in Mumbai, for a year each. Then he worked for four years as a clerk in Spring Mill at Wadala in Mumbai before starting his career as a journalist, sequentially in Hind Mazdoor, Nava Kal, and Nava Shakti dailies.

His columns were published in different Marathi magazines, including Rahasyaranjan, Abhiruchee, Manoos, Sobat, Dinank, Kridangan, and Chandrayug.

In 1989, Padhye suffered an attack of paralysis.

He was married to Shoshna Mazgoankar, a labour union activist

== Literary works ==
=== Novels ===
- Dombaryacha Khel, 1960, Majestic Book Stall, Mumbai
- Vaitag Vadi, 1965, Sadhana Prakashan, Pune
- Vasunaka, 1965, Popular Prakashan, Mumbai
- Barrister Aniruddha Dhopeshvarkar, 1968, Popular Prakashan, Mumbai
- Agresar, 1968, G. M. Prabhu Prakashan, Mumbai
- Homesick Brigade, 1974, Amey Prakashan, Nagpur
- Rada, 1975, Forward Publication, Mumbai
- Vanava, 1978, Indraneel Prakashan, Mumbai
- Ward No. 7 Surgical, 1980, Dimple Publication, Vasai
- Karanta, 1981, Majestic Prakashan
- Jailbirds, 1982, Dimple Publication, Vasai

=== Story collections ===
- Ek Sunehara Khwab, 1980, Dhaara Prakashan, Aurangabad
- Murgi, 1981, Dimple Publication, Vasai
- Thalipeeth, 1984, Dimple Publication, Vasai
- Thodisi Jo Pee Le, 1986, Saras Prakashan, Vasai
- Bhau Padhye Yanchya Shreshth Katha, 2009, edited by Dilip Purushottam Chitre, Lokvangmay Griha, Mumbai

=== Play ===
- Operation Chhakka, 1969

=== Movie script ===
- Godam (1984). (Directed by Dilip Chitre, the movie received in 1985 a Special Jury Award for direction at the France International Film Festival.)

=== Other writings ===
- Pichakari, 1979, Dinapushpa Prakashan, Mumbai
- Sajati Hai Yun Hi Mehefil, 1981
- Gurudatt, 1990, Lokvangmaya Griha, Mumbai

== Literary accolades ==
- Maharashtra State Award for the novel Vaitag Vadi (1965)
- Lalit Award for Barrister Aniruddha Dhopeshwarkar (1968)
- Maharashtra State Literature and Culture Board Fellowship (1993)
