= Vishnu Wagh =

Indian politician and poet (1964–2019)

Vishnu Surya Naik Wagh
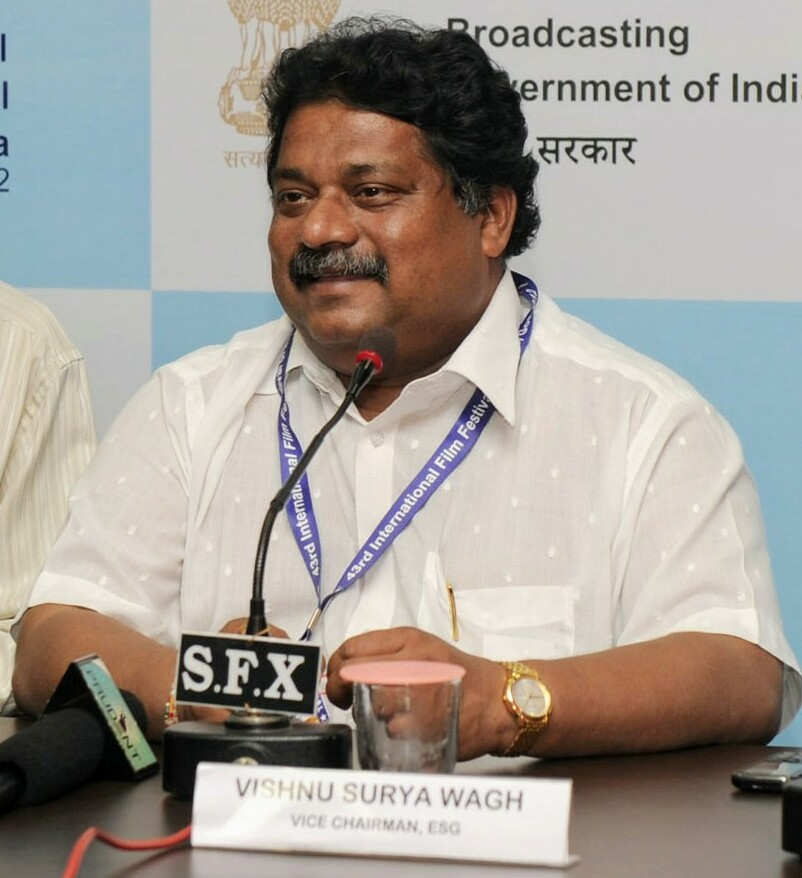
- Wagh in 2012

Member of Goa Legislative Assembly
- In office 2012–2017
- Preceded by: Francisco Silveira
- Succeeded by: Francisco Silveira
- Constituency: St. Andre

Personal details
- Born: 24 July 1964 Dongri, Tiswadi, Goa, India
- Died: 8 February 2019 (aged 54) Cape Town, South Africa
- Spouse: Sharmila Rao (m. 1989; div. 2006) Aruna Chodankar (m. 2006)
- Children: 4
- Occupation: Politician; artist; writer; poet; playwright
- Awards: Yuva Srujan Puraskar (2008)

Vishnu Surya Naik Wagh (24 July 1964 – 8 February 2019) was an Indian poet, writer, dramatist, journalist and politician. He was a former member of the Legislative Assembly in Goa from 2012 to 2017 as a member of the Bharatiya Janata Party. Owing to his fragile health, he had been on a break from his active career since 2016, until his death in 2019. His book, Sudhir Sukta, was a topic of much debate in 2017—2018 for its offensive language and content.

== Early life ==
Vishnu Wagh was born in the village of Dongri in Tiswadi to Indu and Surya Wagh. He had three siblings – Ramrao, Smita and Jyotsna, and was the second child. Being a smart child, he read all the books that his father had in the house multiple times. He was greatly influenced by writers like Khadilkar, Kanetkar and Gadkari. When a local library was opened, he became a regular visitor. The librarian would advise him on the choice of books to borrow and read. He thus got access to mystery novels and Shringarik literature, which he used to read sitting in the Maalo (transl. attic) of his home. Due to some reason the library was closed, but by that time Wagh had become a Panch at their Village Panchayat. He reopened the Library. He spent a lot of time with his relatives and friends in Ponda. He acted in many dramas as a child artist, under the guidance of his father, Surya Wagh, who was an actor in his Marathi theatre group, Hauns Sangeet Natya Mandal. He used to enact famous mythological characters like Krishna and Rama in Dhalo performances.

His family was not very religious, but they were interested in Bhajan, Kirtan and readings of religious texts. Wagh regularly attended the Kirtan programmes at the Shri Ram – Hanuman Mandir in their village. He used to devoutly listen to the Kirtankar. Once, one of the Kirtankars asked the children to learn Ramdas' ovya (transl. verses), which Wagh did and could recite perfectly. He had a good rapport with all the Kirtankars that visited the village ever since that incident. One of them, named Valimbe taught him about the whole art of Kirtan. Valimbe also remained in touch with him through letters. Wagh also became close to Brahmanand Swami.

He won a rank at the Class X Board examination and went on to study science at MES College. He used to stay at his maternal aunt's place in Vasco. After being encouraged by his professors, he started participating in various competitions. He signed up at the Municipal Library in Vasco, made friends with other artistes and started writing and directing one act plays. It was during these days that he first ventured into journalism, drawing caricatures, dramas, poetry and elocution. The next year he got a first class, with the highest marks in Languages, but did not do as well in Science and Math due to lack of interest. He subsequently completed a BSc in Chemistry and Zoology from Dhempe College of Arts and Science. He actively participated in students' movements and was guided by Nandkumar Kamat. He was enrolled in Goa University, pursuing his MSc in Biochemistry, when his father died in 1987. He then decided to take responsibility and shifted to journalism in his second year.

== Socio-cultural career ==
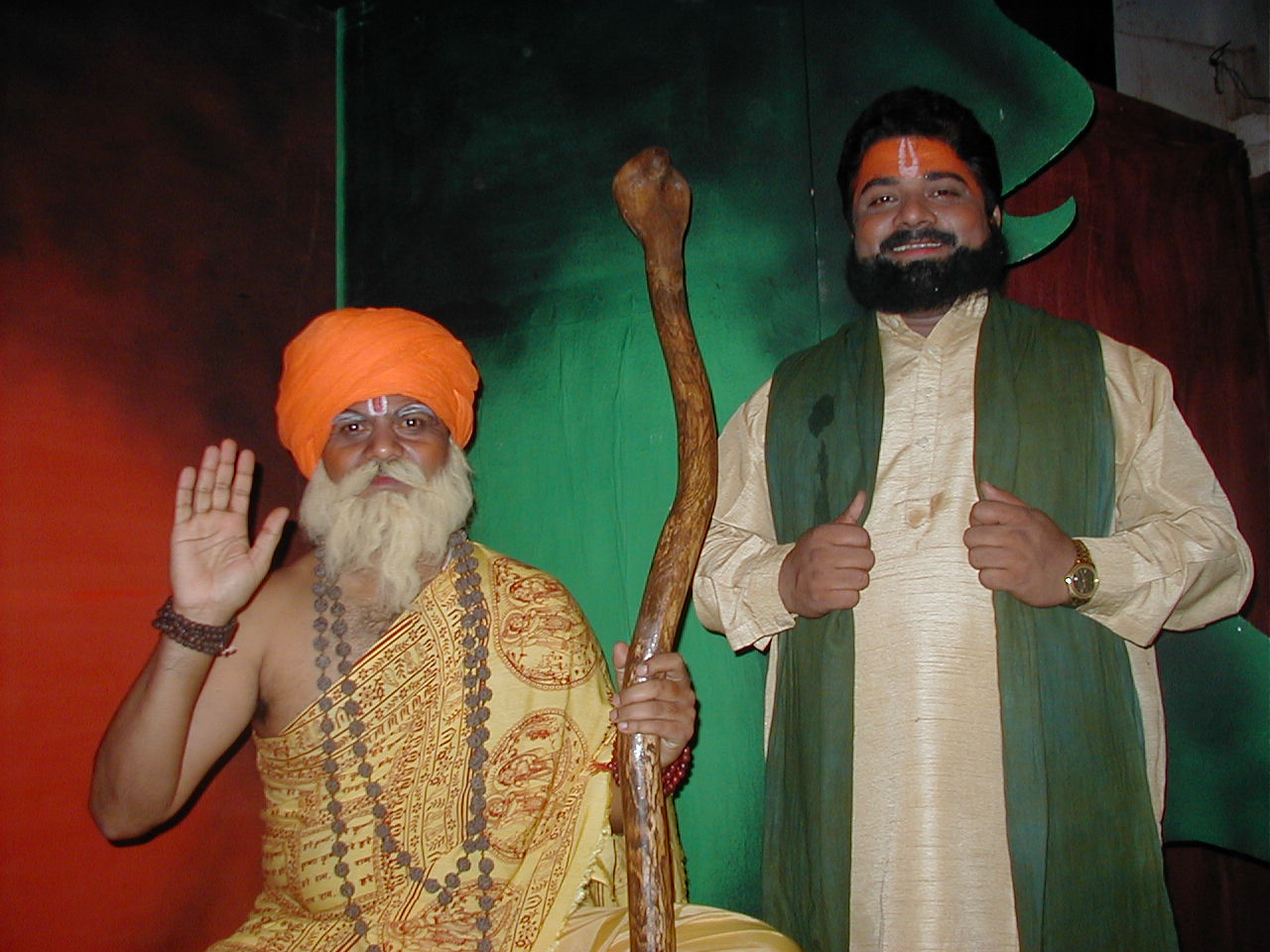
Vishnu Wagh and team stage a performance at their village temple in Tiswadi in 2006

Vishnu Wagh had been actively involved in the socio-cultural field for many years. Over the years, he indulged in poetry; drawing cartoons and caricatures; study of Vedic and sant literature, heritage, and anthropology; and had even been a part of environment campaigns. He had been connected to Brahmanand Swami of Tapobhumi (who died in 2003).

Soon after completing his education, Wagh began his career by joining Newslink, an English publication of the Tarun Bharat group, and later joined the Tarun Bharat team in Belgaum (after Newslink was abruptly shut down). He also played a role in setting up the daily newspapers, Vartamaan (funded by mine owners) and Sudarshan. He later went on to become the youngest editor of Gomantak.

He wrote over 20 plays in Marathi, three sangeet nataks (transl. musical plays), 18 Konkani plays and 16 one-act plays. He directed over 50 plays in Konkani and Marathi. Some of his critically acclaimed plays include Tuka Abhang Abhang, Suvari, Teen Poishancho Tiatro, Dharmashree, and Pedru Poddlo Baient. He also wrote six volumes of poetry and emerged as an eminent poet in these languages. His poem, Shahar Ani Ganv (transl. Town and Village), features in the Class IX Marathi textbook of the Maharashtra Board of Education.

Wagh was also a part of Marathi cinema, after writing the lyrics of movies like Gadya Aapla Gaon Bara and the screenplay of a few others, like Sarpanch Bhagirath. He was also a powerful orator, known for his speech writing and delivery.

Wagh's work often talked about the oppression of the masses by the higher castes. He was a supporter of their rights, especially those of the Bhandari community.

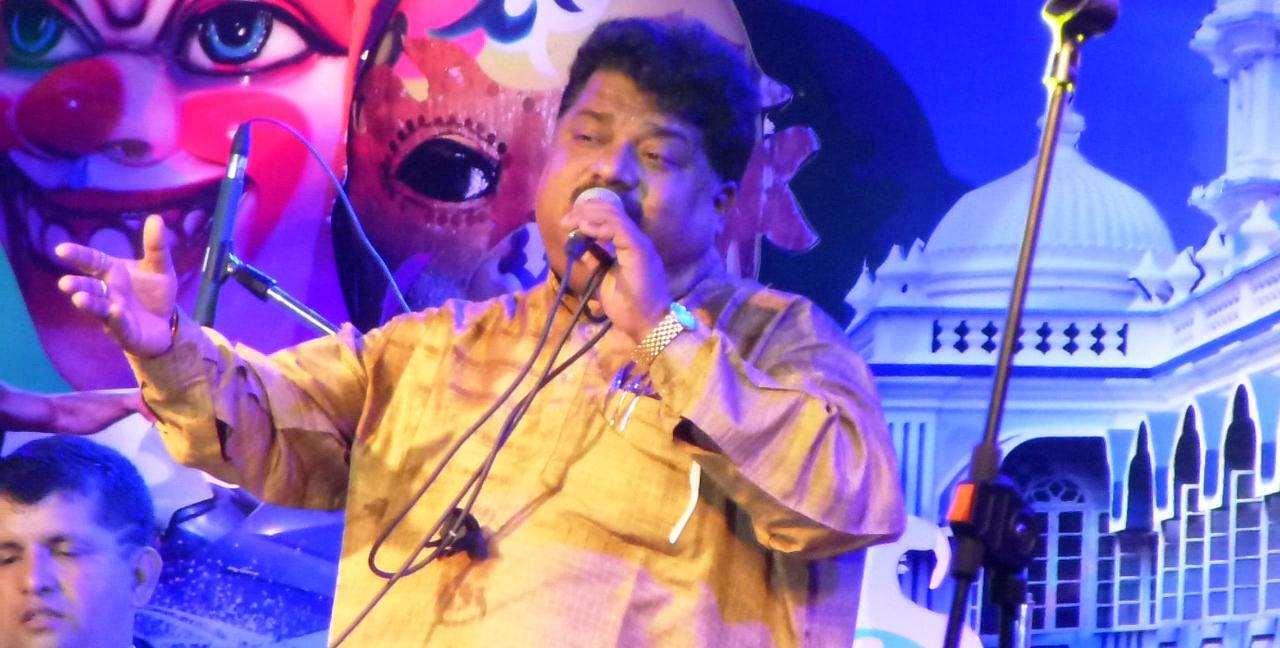
Vishnu Wagh singing at an event in 2013

He held the following positions:

- Chairman of Kala Academy
- Vice-Chairman of Entertainment Society of Goa (ESG)
- Editor of the Marathi daily, Gomantak
- President of Gomantak Natya Sammelan and Yuva Marathi Sahitya Sammelan
- Executive Member of the World Marathi Academy
- Spokesman of Akhil Bharatiya Bhandari Mahasangh

== Political career ==
Wagh's political career began in the 1990s with the Shiv Sena and the MGP. Then, after 14 years of being a former general secretary and spokesperson of the Goa Pradesh Congress Committee, Wagh joined the Bharatiya Janata Party on 30 October 2011, in the presence of senior BJP leaders — Laxmikant Parsekar, MP Shripad Naik, and Manohar Parrikar.

He won the 2012 Goa Legislative Assembly election with a margin of 1219 votes from Constituency Number 14, St. Andre Constituency – consisting of the 7 villages of Goa Velha (St Andre), Azossim-Mandur, Neura, Batim, Agacaim (St Lawrence), Pale-Siridao and Curca-Bambolim-Telaulim.

On 14 January 2016, he was elected as the Deputy speaker of the Goa Legislative Assembly.

After Wagh's illness, his brother, Ramrao Wagh, was selected by the BJP as his successor to contest the seat of St Andre in the 2017 Goa Legislative Assembly election. Ramrao is a professor working at Goa University, who holds a BSc degree in Physics and a masters in computer applications. However, he lost to the Congress candidate, Francisco Silveira, who was in power before Vishnu Wagh.

== Awards ==
- Bakibab Borkar Award, Mumbai (2003)
- Damani Award, Solapur (2003)
- Yashwantrao Chavan Award, Pune
- Pune Festival Award
- Dhananjay Keer Award, Mumbai
- Kala Academy Awards
- Gomant Vidya Niketan Award
- Gomantak Marathi Academy Award
- Goa Ratna Award
- Vidya Vachaspati Award
- Yuva Chetna Award
- Acharya P K Atre Sahitya Puraskar

== Illness and death ==
In May 2016, Wagh suffered a massive heart attack, resulting in significant kidney damage. In August 2016, he suffered another heart attack, while at a public function in Panaji. He then underwent an angioplasty at the Goa Medical College (GMC) and was later shifted to Mumbai, where he was first treated at Hinduja Hospital, Mahim, and was later shifted to Kokilaben Dhirubhai Ambani Hospital at Andheri. This was due to the latter hospital's better neurosurgical facilities. While admitted in Mumbai, he was visited by many celebrities like Nana Patekar and Mahesh Manjrekar. He was also treated by the Goan-born neurosurgeon P. S. Ramani. Wagh returned to Goa in April 2017, when he was discharged. He had since been hospitalized multiple times.

Wagh died in his sleep on 8 February 2019, while on tour in South Africa with his wife. His death was reported by his wife Aruna five days after, which caused his siblings to raise questions about the circumstances surrounding the incident. In response to this, his wife issued a statement that Wagh had been admitted to Manipal Hospital in Dona Paula for the two months prior to his death, where he expressed an interest in not dying in a hospital room, and that he wanted to visit Johannesburg and Cape Town. She further shared a poem written by him in Marathi titled Marnyapurvichya Kahi Suchana (transl. Few Instructions to Follow Before Death).

Wagh was cremated with full state honours at Ponda on 17 February 2019. His body arrived early that morning at Dabolim Airport and was escorted by State Minister of Art and Culture, Govind Gaude, to his residence in Dhavali, Ponda. The body was then taken for public viewing and prayers at Dayanand Bandodkar Ground, Kashimath, Ponda. The funeral consisted of inter-religious prayers and a musical and literary tribute to him, and had many prominent attendees from the fields of politics, art and literature. The police presented Wagh with the salami shastra and the shok shastra. Wagh was later cremated at Ponda Municipal Crematorium, named Warkhende. The final rites were performed by Vishnu's son Priyadarshan, in the presence of Vishnu's younger son and his brother Ramrao. Some time later, then Deputy Speaker Michael Lobo issued a statement that Wagh must be awarded the Padma Shri for his work.

== Reception ==
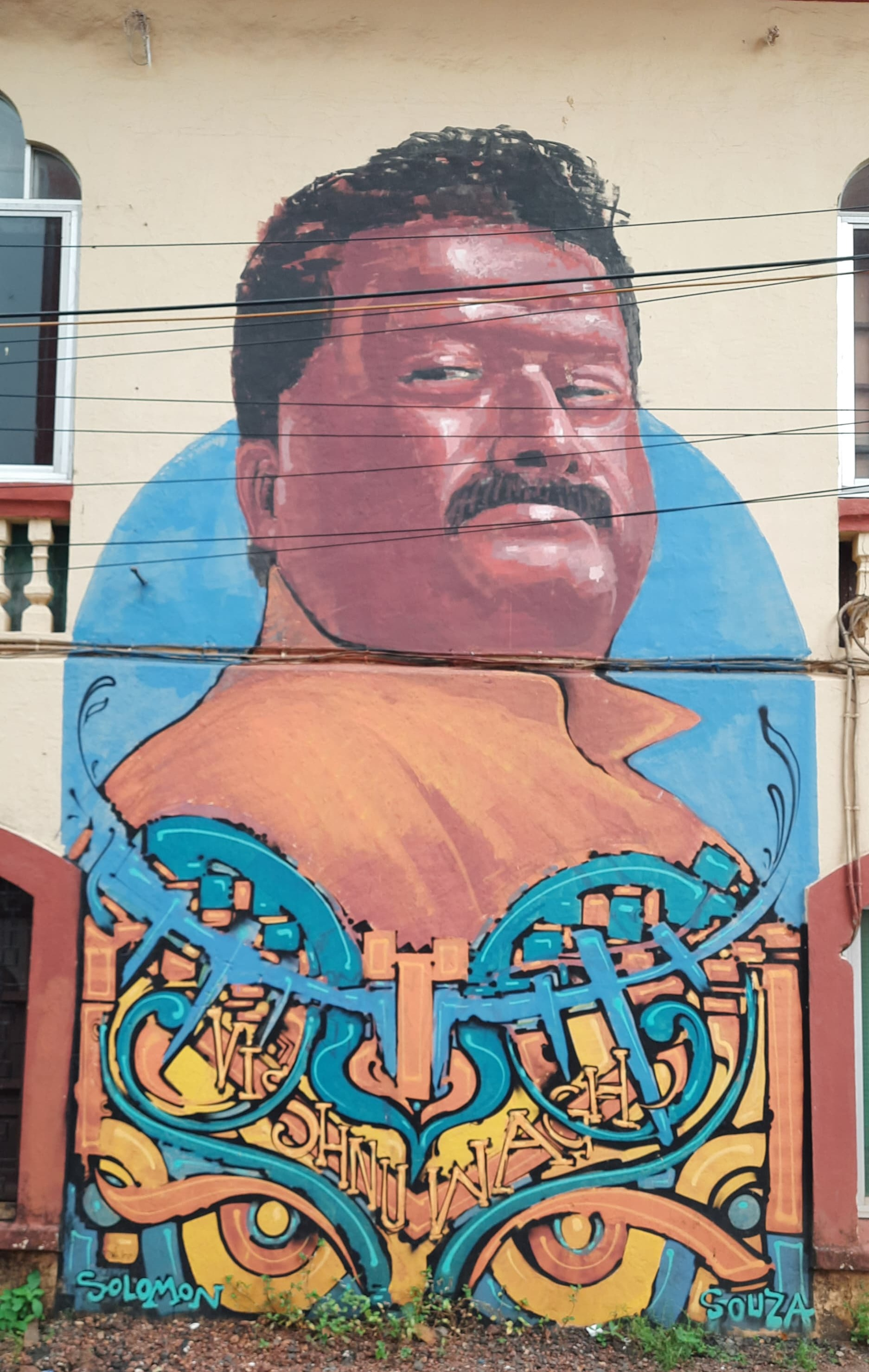
Mural of Vishnu Wagh by Solomon Souza in Panjim, Goa

More than twenty years ago, Wagh's acclaimed play, Tuka Abhang Abhang, caused public outrage for having depicted the Purohits murdering Sant Tukaram.

In August 2017, Wagh's anthology of poems, Sudhir Sukta (transl. Hymns of a Shudra), was declared to be the awardee of the Goa Konkani Akademi (GKA) Award in the poetry category. This caused an outrage campaign on social media, which saw some of its more controversial verses being shared. In October 2017, the Goa government cancelled all the thirty-two literature and culture awards – the results of which were hitherto undeclared – including the one for Wagh. Upon a complaint filed by Goan women's rights activist, Auda Viegas, an FIR was later registered against Wagh and the publishing house, Apurbai Prakashan (run by Hema Naik), under Sections 292, 293 of the Indian Penal Code and Section 4 of The Indecent Representation of Women (Prohibition) Act. This was regarding the book's representation of women and castes. A few weeks later, the BJP government, of which Wagh was a part of before his illness, issued a statement that the FIR would be withdrawn, as the "language used by Mr. Wagh in the book is the language of masses".

== Personal life ==
Vishnu Wagh was previously married to Sharmila Rao, with whom he had two children, one of whom is named Parth. After their divorce in 2006, he married Aruna Chodankar, who is employed as an officer in the Labour Department of the Union Labour Ministry of India. They had two boys together – Priyadarshan and Gagansurya.

== See also ==
- Kala Academy
- List of Marathi-language poets
- International Film Festival of India
