= Laxman Gaikwad =

Marathi writer

Laxman Maruti Gaikwad (born 23 July 1952, Dhanegaon, Latur District, Maharashtra) is a famous Marathi novelist known for his best work The Branded, a translation of his autobiographical novel Uchalaya (also known as Ucalaya). This novel not only gave him international recognition but he was also awarded the Maharashtra Gourav Puraskar, and the Sahitya Akademi award for this novel. Considered a masterpiece in Marathi literature, his novel for the first time brings to the world of literature the trials and tribulations of his tribe, Uchalya, literally the pilferers, a term coined by the British who classified the tribe as a criminal tribe. This book also brings in the problems faced by the Dalits in India. At present he is residing in Mumbai.

Other notable novels written by him include Dubang, Chini Mathachi Divas, Samaj Sahitya Ani Swathantra, Wadar Vedna, Vakila Pardhi, Utav and A Swathantra Konasat.

== Social services ==
Gaikwad has been associated with social services for a long time. Since 1986, he was the president of the Jankalyan Vikas Sanstha and since 1990, he has been the president of the Denotified and Nomadic Tribes Organization, an organization associated with the welfare of Tribes. He has actively participated in the Labor Movement and worked for the welfare of the farmers, slum-dwellers and the other weaker-sections of the society.

== Books published ==
1. Uchalya
2. He Swatantrey konasati
3. Chini Matitil Divas
4. Samaj Sahitya Ani Swatantrey
5. Vakilya Pardhi
6. Wadar Vedna
7. Buddhachi Vippassanna
8. Dhubang
9. Dr. B.R. Ambedkaranchi Jivan Ani karya
10. Utav
11. Gav Kusa Baheril Mansa

== Awards and honors ==
Gaikwad has won many awards. They are:

International awards

1. SAARC Literary Award, 2001 by President of India

Government awards

1. Youngest Sahitya Academy Award winner in 1988
2. Maharashtra Gourav Puraskar in 1990.
3. Best writer award from Government of Maharashtra in 2003

Other awards

1. Pimpri Chinchwad Mahanagar Palika Award
2. Pune Mahanagar Palika Award
3. Gourav Sanman Puraskar from Nashik Municipality Corporation
4. Maharashtra Kamgar Kalyan Mandal Sanman Puraskar
5. Sahitya Ratna Anna Bhau Sathe Puraskar
6. Gourav Sanman Puraskar from Bahujan Karmachari
7. Maharashtra Foundation Puraskar for the best writer
8. Gunther Sontheimer Memorial Award
9. Samata Award
10. Sanjivini Puraskar
11. Panghanti Award
12. Mukadam Award
13. Galib Ratna Puraskar, Mumbai
14. Dr. Babasaheb Ambedkar Puraskar

Honors

1. Title of Stalwarts Limca Book of Records
2. Many books are referred for studies in many universities and schools in India by students
3. Drama Act was performed on Uchalya at National level
4. Documentary film has been prepared by Govt. of India on Uchalya

== Earlier government membership (ex-member) ==
1. State and Central Government Literature Department Member
2. National Human Rights Commission Member
3. Sahitya Academy Convener
4. Member- Maharashtra State Backward Class Commission
