= The City of Love =

2007 novel by Rimi B. Chatterjee

The War
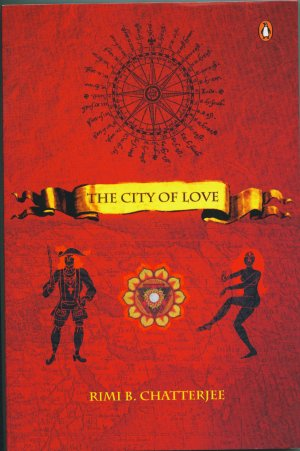
- Cover of the Indian edition
- Author: Rimi B. Chatterjee
- Cover artist: Pinaki De
- Language: English
- Genre: Literary fiction
- Publisher: Penguin India
- Publication date: 2007
- Publication place: India
- Media type: Print (novel)
- Pages: 325
- ISBN: 978-0-14-310381-3
- OCLC: 190842805
- LC Class: MLCS 2007/00664 (P) PR9499.3.C4653
- Preceded by: Signal Red

The City of Love (2007) is a novel by Rimi B. Chatterjee set in 16th-century Asia against the background of the spice trade, piracy and the rise of various mystical religious cults. It traces the lives of four characters all of whom are in search of spiritual and material fulfilment embodied in the idea of the 'city of love'. The book was shortlisted for the Vodafone Crossword Book Award 2007.

== Plot summary ==
The City of Love begins with the siege of Malacca by the Portuguese in 1510. Fernando Almenara is a Castilian trader captured in the abortive first siege of Malacca. Fernando has a secret: he is fleeing the Inquisition in Florence for his involvement with a Cabalist group there, and the invasion of Florence by the Holy Alliance in 1509 meant death to him and his friends. During the siege he is kidnapped by Daud Suleiman ibn Shams al Basri, a sharp young Arab physician and pirate based in Chittagong. Fernando joins Daud's ship, the Shaan-e-Dariya, crewed by fugitives and renegades from all over the known world, and comes to their home port.

Chandu Sadashiva is the son of a Shaiva priest exiled from Gaur, West Bengal to the wilds of rural Chittagong. His father Bhairavdas is determined to turn him into a powerful Tantric warrior against the foreign polluters of his land, but Chandu has other ideas. He forms a secret attachment with Bajja, a tribal girl eight years older than he is, who becomes his secret role model and ideal. Things fall apart when Bajja asks Chandu's father to initiate her into the Tantra but he tries to seduce her and she escapes. Bitterly disappointed, she vows to find enlightenment or die by fasting at the cremation ground. Desperately ill from weeks of starvation, she is rescued by the wise woman Dhumavati who undertakes to train her.

At first Fernando's band of pirates does well from their excellent piratical harbour, but then the Portuguese come to Chittagong and change the rules with their cannon and brutal ways. The pirate band breaks up, Fernando runs from agents of the Inquisition and falls in love with Bajja deep in the forest. Bajja is being taught the Sahajiya Buddhist Tantra by Dhumavati, while Fernando has training in the Christian Cabala, and together he and Bajja teach each other about love and the lore.

Meanwhile, thirteen-year-old Chandu and his father have set out for Gaur to begin Chandu's formal training, but they are ambushed on the way, Bhairavdas is killed and Chandu wounded in the throat and sold into slavery. Daud, who is travelling with a wandering Sufi, rescues and heals him. Chandu, temporarily speechless, is apprenticed to a blacksmith and takes the name Kalketu, having lost his Brahminical heritage. He becomes an accomplished Sufi qawwal or devotional singer.

Bajja is now wandering the countryside, teaching other Tantrics her wisdom in secret places, but she is becoming disillusioned with the way Dhumavati treats their followers. Finally Dhumavati persuades her to take part in a Tantric ritual which involves killing a child, and in disgust she gives up the life of a guru and disappears to seek her own truth. Fernando is crushed, and he returns to Chittagong where he agrees to return to Amsterdam with an old shipmate and join the Family of Love.

In the background of Sher Shah Suri's and Humayun's invasions of Bengal (1538–1540), Chandu sets off to look for Bajja and finds her herding pigs on top of a desolate mountain in Assam. They speak of all that has befallen them, lie down and make love.

The first part of the book is set against the spice trade from Antwerp to Indonesia, the greatest network of goods and ideas the world has ever known, and the struggle for supremacy in Chittagong between Bengal, Tripura and Arakan, and the Portuguese empire. In this cultural cauldron, established Hindu and Buddhist Tantric, Vaishnav and tribal traditions meet the three-centuries-old incursion of Islam and the dawning of contact with the West.

== Reviews ==
- Roy, Sumana (6 January 2008). "Ambiguous journey". Literary Review. The Hindu. Archived from the original on 2008-01-07.
- "Paperback Pickings: Inside the temple of the mind". Opinion. The Telegraph (India). 30 November 2007. Archived from the original on 2016-03-04.
- Ratna, Kalpish (3 December 2007). "The fantastic voyage". Hindustan Times.
- Chatterjee, Madhusree (13 July 2008). "Spice and spirituality". The Sunday Tribune.
- Kumar, S. Nanda (10 February 2008). "Setting sail into history". Deccan Herald. Archived from the original on 2008-02-13.
- Lal, Ranjit (15 February 2008). "Tales of the yore". Sahara Time. Archived from the original on 2008-04-24.
