= Bhau Panchbhai =

Indian Marathi language poet, writer, and Ambedkarite-Dalit activist

Bhau Panchabhai (1 March 1944 - 21 January 2016) was an Indian Marathi language poet, writer, and Ambedkarite-Dalit activist. He is best known for his first poetry collection Hunkaar Vadaalnche for which he was awarded by the Government of Maharashtra for the best poetry collection of 1989. His poetry is considered as a prototype of Ambedkarite poetry and is translated in various languages including English. He lived in Nagpur and worked as a lawyer. He was awarded Laxmibai Ingole, Kavya Puruskar by the Laxmibai Ingole Foundation Amravati in 2015 for his contribution to Ambedkarite literature.

== Ambedkarite activist and writings ==
He was active in the Ambedkarite movement and Panthers of India.

Writings -

(A)poetry collection

- Hunkaar Vaadalaanche ( हुंकार वादळांचे) 1989
- Nikharyaanchyaa Raangolyaa (निखाऱ्यांच्या रांगोळ्या) 2004
- Abhanganchya Thingya (अभंगांच्या ठिणग्या) 2014
- Spandanpisara (स्पंदनपिसारा) 2014
- Aakantgandha (आकांतगंधा)

Being Released Shortly
(B) LALIT LEKH

- Jakhamancha Ajintha (जखमांचा अजिंठा) 1992

(C) VAICHARIK LEKH

- Samajkranti (समाजक्रांती) 1992
