= Varjesh Solanki =

Varjesh Solanki is a noted Marathi poet born in Agashi (Vasai), Mumbai.

== Biography ==
Varjesh Solanki was born in 1970. He has two collections of poems to his credit: i) Varjesh Solankichya Kavita (2002) and ii) Ta Ta Pa Pa (2009) both published by Abhidhanantar Prakashan, Mumbai., 'Diddamdina' his autobiography (lokvagmay), 'perugan murugan'(lokvagmay) short fiction also in his credit. He translate famous Gujrati Poet Kamal vora poetry collection 'vrudhashatak'(lokvagmay) in marathi.

He has won important awards like Vishakha and `Vasant Puraskar’ for his collection given by Vasant Sansthan., Savantwadi, Goa. His mother tongue is Gujarati. His poems have been translated into Hindi and Malayalam.

== Bibliography ==
- Varjesh Solankichya Kavita (POETRY)
- Ta Ta Pa Pa (POETRY)
- Diddamdina (LALIT GADYA)
- perugan murugan (SHORT FICTION)
- vrudhashatak (GUJRATI POET KAMAL VORA TRANSLATION)

HUSENBHAI AUR GANPATBAHI VIA AMERICA (SHORT STORIES) VERVIKHER ( POETRY) ANEK EK ( TRANSLATION)

== Online poetry ==
- Poem of Advertisement
