= Manya Joshi =

Marathi poet

Manya Joshi (born 17th July, 1972) is a Marathi poet based in Mumbai.

He has a Master's in Marathi literature from Mumbai University and a Master's in Library and Information Studies from the University of Oklahoma, USA. He works as a freelance library research advisor and copywriter. He also writes short fiction and literary criticism. He is closely associated with the little magazine movement of the nineties, especially with the periodical Abhidhanantar. His collection of poems Jyam Maja is published by Abhidhanantar Publications.

The literary critic Sachin Ketkar in his introduction to Live Update: An Anthology of Recent Marathi Poetry writes, "He is one of the most experimental poets writing today. He represents the post-modernist sensibility in Marathi today".

== Online poetry ==
- An Announcement for Mr and Mrs Limaye^{[usurped]}
