= Arun Kolatkar =

Indian poet (1932–2004)

- Born: 1 November 1932; Kolhapur, Kolhapur State, British India
- Died: 25 September 2004 (aged 71); Pune, Maharashtra, India
- Occupation: Poet
- Spouse(s): Darshan Chhabda (div 1966); Soonu Kolatkar
- Writing career
- Notable work: Jejuri
- Notable awards: Sahitya Akademi Award; Commonwealth Poetry Prize
- Movement: Indian postmodernism

Arun Balkrishna Kolatkar (1 November 1932 – 25 September 2004) was an Indian poet who wrote in both Marathi and English. His poems are known for expressing the humour in everyday life. Kolatkar is the only Indian poet, other than Kabir, to be featured on the World Classics titles of New York Review of Books.

His first English poetry collection, Jejuri, won the Commonwealth Poetry Prize in 1977. His Marathi verse collection Bhijki Vahi won a Sahitya Akademi Award in 2005. An anthology of his works, Collected Poems in English, edited by Arvind Krishna Mehrotra, was published in Britain by Bloodaxe Books in 2010. Trained as an artist at the J. J. School of Art, he was also a graphic designer.

== Life ==
Kolatkar was born in Kolhapur, Maharashtra, where his father, Tatya Kolatkar, worked as an officer in the education department. He lived in a traditional Hindu extended family, along with his uncle's family. He has described their nine-room house as "a house of cards. Five in a row on the ground, topped by three on the first, and one on the second floor." The floors had to be "plastered with cowdung every week."

He attended Rajaram High School in Kolhapur, where Marathi was the medium of instruction. After graduation in 1949, he joined S. B. College of Arts, Gulbarga, from which he graduated in 1957.

In 1953, he married Darshan Chhabda (the sister of well-known painter Bal Chhabda). Both families opposed the marriage, partly because Kolatkar had not yet sold any of his paintings.

His early years in Mumbai were poor but eventful, especially as an emerging artist in the Rampart Row neighbourhood, where the Artists' Aid Fund Centre was located. Around this time, he also translated Tukaram into English. This period of struggle and transition has been captured in his Marathi poem 'The Turnaround':

Bombay made me a beggar.
Kalyan gave me a lump of jaggery to suck.
In a small village that had a waterfall
but no name
my blanket found a buyer
and I feasted on plain ordinary water.
I arrived in Nasik with
peepul leaves between my teeth.
There I sold my Tukaram
to buy some bread and mince. (translation by Kolatkar)

After many years of struggle, he started work as an art director and graphic designer in several advertising agencies, such as Lintas. By the mid-60s, he was established as a graphic artist and joined an eclectic group of creatives headed by the legendary advertising professional Kersy Katrak. It was Katrak, himself a poet, who pushed Kolatkar into bringing out Jejuri. Kolatkar was, in advertising jargon, a 'visualizer,' and soon became one of Mumbai's most successful art directors. He won the prestigious Communication Arts Guild award for advertising six times and was admitted to the CAG Hall of Fame.

By 1966, his marriage with Darshan was in trouble, and Kolatkar developed a drinking problem. This faded after they dissolved the marriage by mutual agreement, and he married his second wife, Soonu.

== Marathi Poetry and influence ==
His Marathi poems of the 1950s and 1960s are written "in the Bombay argot of the migrant working classes and the underworld, part Hindi, part Marathi, which the Hindi film industry would make proper use of only decades later". For instance, consider the following, which intersperses Hindi dialect into the Marathi:

मै भाभीको बोला	main bhAbhiiko bolA
क्या भाईसाबके ड्यूटीपे मै आ जाऊ ?	kya bhAisAbke dyuTipe main A jAu?
भड़क गयी साली	bhaRak gayi sAli
रहमान बोला गोली चलाऊँगा	rahmAn bolA goli chalAungA
मै बोला एक रंडीके वास्ते?	mai bolA ek raNDike wAste?
चलाव गोली गांडू	chalao goli gaNDu (quoted in

To match this in his English translation, he sometimes adopts "a cowboy variety":

allow me beautiful
I said to my sister-in-law
to step in my brother's booties
you had it coming said Rehman
a gun in his hand
shoot me punk
kill your brother, I said
for a bloody cunt (Three cups of Tea)

In Marathi, his poetry is the quintessence of modernism as expressed in the 'little magazine movement' of the 1950s and 1960s. His early Marathi poetry was radically experimental and reflected influences from European avant-garde trends like surrealism, expressionism and Beat Generation poetry. These poems are oblique, whimsical and at the same time dark, sinister, and exceedingly funny. Some of these characteristics appear in Jejuri and Kala Ghoda Poems in English, but his early Marathi poems are far more radical, dark and humorous than his English poems. His early Marathi poetry is far more audacious and takes greater liberties with language. However, in his later Marathi poetry, the language is more accessible and less radical than in his earlier works. His later works, Chirimiri, Bhijki Vahi, and Droan are less introverted and less nightmarish. They show a greater social awareness, and his satire becomes more direct. Bilingual poet and anthologist Vilas Sarang assigns great importance to Kolatkar's contribution to Marathi poetry, pointing to Chirimiri in particular as "a work that must give inspiration and direction to all future Marathi poets".

He won the Kusumagraj Puraskar from the Marathwada Sahitya Parishad in 1991 and the Bahinabai Puraskar from Bahinabai Prathistan in 1995. His Marathi poetry collections include:

- Arun Kolatkarcha Kavita (1977)
- Chirimiri (2004)
- Bhijki Vahi (2004) (received the Sahitya Akademi Award in 2005)
- Droan (2004)

Kolatkar was among a group of post-independence bilingual poets who fused the diction of their mother tongues along with international styles to break new ground in their poetic traditions; others in this group included Gopalakrishna Adiga (Kannada), Raghuvir Sahay (Hindi), Dilip Chitre (also Marathi), Sunil Gangopadhyay, Malay Roy Choudhury (Bengali), etc.

=== Influences ===
Marathi devotional poetry and popular theater (tamasha) had early influences on Kolatkar. American beat poetry, especially of William Carlos Williams were later influences. Along with friends like Dilip Chitre, he was caught up in the modern shift in Marathi poetry, which was pioneered by B. S. Mardhekar.

When asked by an interviewer who his favorite poets and writers were, he set out a large multilingual list. While the answer is part rebuff, the list is indicative of the wide, fragmented sources he may have mined, and is worth quoting in full:

Whitman, Mardhekar, Manmohan, Eliot, Pound, Auden, Hart Crane, Dylan Thomas, Kafka, Baudelaire, Heine, Catullus, Villon, Jynaneshwar, Namdev, Janabai, Eknath, Tukaram, Wang Wei, Tu Fu, Han Shan, C, Honaji, Mandelstam, Dostoevsky, Gogol, Isaac Bashevis Singer, Babel, Apollinaire, Breton, Brecht, Neruda, Ginsberg, Barth, Duras, Joseph Heller ... Gunter Grass, Norman Mailer, Henry Miller, Nabokov, Namdeo Dhasal, Patthe Bapurav, Rabelais, Apuleius, Rex Stout, Agatha Christie, Robert Shakley, Harlan Ellison, Balchandra Nemade, Durrenmatt, Aarp, Cummings, Lewis Carroll, John Lennon, Bob Dylan, Sylvia Plath, Ted Hughes, Godse Bhatji, Morgenstern, Chakradhar, Gerard Manley Hopkins, Balwantbuva, Kierkegaard, Lenny Bruce, Bahinabai Chaudhari, Kabir, Robert Johnson, Muddy Waters, Leadbelly, Howling Wolf, Jon Lee Hooker, Leiber and Stoller, Larry Williams, Lightning Hopkins, Andre Vajda, Kurosawa, Eisenstein, Truffaut, Woody Guthrie, Laurel and Hardy."

== English poetry ==
Kolatkar was hesitant about bringing out his English verse, but his very first book, Jejuri, had a wide impact among fellow poets and littérateurs like Nissim Ezekiel and Salman Rushdie. Brought out from a small press, it was reprinted twice in quick succession, and Pritish Nandy was quick to anthologize him in the cult collection, Strangertime. For some years, some of his poems were also included in school texts.

The poem sequence deals with a visit to Jejuri, a pilgrimage site for the local Maharashtrian deity Khandoba (a local deity, also an incarnation of Shiva). In a conversation with poet Eunice de Souza, Kolatkar says he discovered Jejuri in 'a book on temples and legends of Maharashtra... there was a chapter on Jejuri in it. It seemed an interesting place'. Along with his brother and a friend, he visited Jejuri in 1963, and appears to have composed some poems shortly thereafter. A version of the poem A low temple was published soon in a magazine called Dionysius, but both the original manuscript and this magazine were lost. Subsequently, the poems were recreated in the 1970s, published in a literary quarterly in 1974, and the book came out in 1976.

The poems evoke a series of images to highlight the ambiguities in modern-day life. Although situated in a religious setting, they are not religious; in 1978, an interviewer asked him if he believed in God, and Kolatkar said: 'I leave the question alone. I don't think I have to take a position about God one way or the other.'

Before Jejuri, Kolatkar had also published other poem sequences, including the boatride, which appeared in the little magazine, damn you: a magazine of the arts in 1968, and was anthologized twice. A few of his early poems in English also appeared in Dilip Chitre's Anthology of Marathi poetry 1945-1965 (1967). Although some of these poems claim to be an 'English version by poet', "their Marathi originals were never committed to paper." (this is also true of some other bilingual poets like Vilas Sarang.

=== Later work ===
A reclusive figure all his life, he lived without a telephone and hesitated to publish his work. It was only after he was diagnosed with cancer that two volumes were brought out by friends – the English poetry volumes Kala Ghoda Poems and Sarpasatra (2004).

Sarpa Satra is an 'English version' of a poem with a similar name in Bhijki Vahi. It is a typical Kolatkar narrative poem like Droan, mixing myth, allegory, and contemporary history. Although Kolatkar was never known as a social commentator, his narrative poems offer a whimsical, tilted commentary on social mores.

Jejuri explores a modern person's relationship with indigenous culture; the Kala Ghoda poems are about Mumbai's dark underbelly—the heterogeneous megapolis, is envisioned in varied perspectives of an underdog. Like Jejuri, Kala Ghoda is also 'a place poem' exploring the myth, history, geography, and ethos of the place. While Jejuri is a popular pilgrimage site for a pastoral god, it could never become Kolatkar's home; Kala Ghoda explores the complexities of a metropolis. Jejuri can be read as a search for belonging, a major fixation of the previous generation of Indian poets in English; Kala Ghoda doesn't betray any anxieties and agonies of 'belonging'. With Kala Ghoda, Indian poetry in English seems to have grown up, shedding adolescent 'identity crises' and goose pimples. The maturity of poetic vision embodied in the Kala Ghoda makes it a milestone in Indian poetry in English.

After his death, a new edition of Jejuri was published in the New York Review Books Classics series with an introduction by Amit Chaudhuri (2006). Around the time of his death, he had also requested Arvind Krishna Mehrotra to edit some of his uncollected poems. These were published as The Boatride and Other Poems by Pras Prakashan in 2008. His Collected Poems in English, edited by Arvind Krishna Mehrotra, was published in Britain by Bloodaxe Books in 2010.

He was survived by his wife, Soonu Kolatkar.

== Appearances in the following poetry Anthologies ==
- The Golden Treasure of Writers Workshop Poetry (2008) ed. by Rubana Huq and published by Writers Workshop, Calcutta
- Ten Twentieth-Century Indian Poets (1976) ed. by R. Parthasarathy and published by Oxford University Press, New Delhi
- The Oxford India Anthology of Twelve Modern Indian Poets (1992) ed. by Arvind Krishna Mehrotra and published by Oxford University Press, New Delhi
- Strangertime: An Anthology of Indian Poetry in English (1977) ed. by Pritish Nandy and published by Hind Pocket Books, New Delhi

== See also ==
- Indian English Literature
- Indian Writing in English
