= Vasant Abaji Dahake =

Marathi Poet

Vasant Abaji Dahake (born March 30, 1942) is a Marathi poet, playwright, short story writer, artist, and critic from Amaravati district in the Maharashtra state of India. In 2009, ee was awarded the Sahitya Akademi Award for his collection Chitralipi.

He was associated with the little magazine movement in Marathi during the mid-1950s and the 1960s. Dahake was the President of the Akhil Bharatiya Marathi Sahitya Sammelan held at Chandrapur in 2012. He is married and has two children.

== Works ==
Poetry

- Yogabhrashta (1972). (Translated into English as A Terrorist of the Spirit by Ranjit Hoskote and Mangesh Kulkarni.)
- Shubha-Wartaman (1987)
- Shunah-Shepa (1996)
- Chitralipi

Fiction

- Adholoka (1975)
- Pratibaddha Ani Martya (1981)

Essays & Literary Criticism

- Yatra Antaryatra (1999)
- Kavita Mhanje Kay? (1991)
- Samakaleen Sahitya (1992)
- Kavitevishayi (1999)

maltekdivarun (2009) Other Works

- Nivadak Sadanand Rege (1996) (A selection of Sadanand Rege's poetry)
- Shaleya Marathi Shabdakosh (1997) (A Marathi dictionary for primary and secondary school students).
- Sankshipta Marathi Vangmayakosh (1998) (Co-editor of an encyclopaedia of Marathi literature)
- Kavita Visavya Shatakachi (2000) (Co-editor of an encyclopaedia of 20th century Marathi poetry)
- Vangmayin Samdnya-Sankalpana Kosh (Co-editor)
