= Manohar Shankar Oak =

Marathi poet, novelist, and translator

- Born: 27 May 1933; Maharashtra, India
- Died: 11 May 1993 (aged 59)
- Occupations: Poet, novelist, and translator
- Writing career
- Notable works: Aaitya Kavita, Manohar Oakanchya Ainshi Kavita, Charsi

Manohar Shankar Oak (27 May 1933 – 11 May 1993) was a Marathi poet, novelist, and translator from Maharashtra, India.

Oak led a Bohemian life style. An influence of English poets like Allen Ginsberg can be discerned in his poetry. The background of Mumbai metropolis often appears in his poems. According to critique Poet SHRIDHAR TILVE he developed his own meters of free verse in poems like HE PRIYATAM ANDHAR and marathisised the sanskrut wordification in such a style that it has changed the flavour of Marathi poetic language.

An Anthology of Marathi Poetry, 1945-65 by Dilip Chitre contains translations of some of Oak's poems. Ref: TIKAHARAN BY Shridhar Tilve SHABDWEL PRAKASHAN 1999

== Works ==
=== Collections of poems ===
आयत्या कविता

मनोहर ओकच्या ऐंशी कविता

=== Novels ===
- Charsi
- Antarvedi
