= Vilas Sarang =

Indian writer (1942–2015)

Vilas Sarang (11 June 1942 – 14 April 2015) was a modernist Indian writer, critic, translator and a professor of English who wrote in Marathi and English. He died in 2015 in Mahim's Hinduja hospital.

== Life ==
Sarang was born in Karwar, Karnataka in the Bhandari caste. He earned his undergraduate degree from Elphinstone College, Mumbai and Ph.D. from Bombay University. He obtained a second Ph.D. in Comparative Literature from Indiana University in 1974. Sarang's stories have appeared in the UK, US, Canada and India in journals such as Encounter, The London Magazine, TriQuarterly, The Malahat Review, and also in the anthologies New Writing in India (Penguin), The Penguin Book of Horror Stories and New Directions No. 41. His first book of short stories, Soledad' was published in 1975 in Marathi. In 1978, his English poetry collection, 'A Kind of Silence' was published. His published books in English include a collection of stories, Fair Tree of the Void (translated from Marathi in 1990), and two novels, In the Land of Enki and The Dinosaurship (2005). His short stories have been translated into French and German.

== Overview of Sarang's work ==
His Marathi book 'सर्जनशोध आणि लिहिता लेखक' (Pursuit of Creation and Author Engaged in Writing) received an award of Government of Maharashtra in year 2008.

== Authorship ==
=== In English ===
- Tandoor Cinders (2008)
- Women in Cages (2006) (also translated in Marathi)
- The Dinosaur Ship (2005)
- A Fair Tree of the Void (1990) (also translated in Marathi)
- Editor of the anthology "Indian English Poetry Since 1950" (1989)
- The Stylistics of Literary Translation (1988)
- A Kind of Silence (1978) (a collection of poetry)
- In the Land of Enki (also translated in Marathi and Hindi)
- Seven Critical Essays

=== In Marathi ===
- अक्षरांचा श्रम केला (2000) (literary criticism)
- आतंक (1999)
- मॅनहोलमधला माणूस
- सिसिफस आणि बेलाक्वा (literary criticism)
- सोलेदाद (1975)
- रुद्र
- सर्जनशोध आणि लिहिता लेखक (received an award from the Government of Maharashtra in 2008)
- चिरंतनाचा गंध
- कविता: १९६९-१९८४ (a collection of poetry)
- Essay by Vilas Sarang (in Marathi)
