= Drighangchoo =

Drighangchoo (Bengali: দ্রিঘাংচু) was an independent magazine published from Kolkata (earlier Calcutta), India and it was the first print magazine in India to deal exclusively with "mature" comics and sequential graphic art. Its name draws inspiration from a fable of the same name by Sukumar Ray, which is about a troubled king's search for a mystery crow. The magazine began in 2009, when six comics enthusiasts from Jadavpur University and an alumnus decided to start a not-for-profit print magazine on comics for Indian readers. The first issue of Drighangchoo was published in 2009. The magazine was written in Bengali and English.

Unlike the focus of "mainstream" Indian comics which heavily borrows from the syndicated superhero comics of the North, the issues of Drighangchoo encouraged local artists and the use of serious story-telling through black-and-white sequential art in the traditional comics format, and the use of experimental and indigenous Indian artistic styles. The narratives in Drighangchoo mostly used Bengali or English as interface languages, and also the wordless form. The magazine was published bi-annually from "under the (crow-infested) trees" of one of the student canteens of Jadavpur University, and had a few devoted and enthusiastic readers from the city of Kolkata, and outside. The magazine folded just after three issues in 2010.
