= Madhav Julian =

Marathi Poet

Madhav Julian (21 January 1894 – 29 November 1939) was the pen name which Madhav Tryambak Patwardhan (Marathi: माधव त्र्यंबक पटवर्धन) used in writing Marathi poetry.

He hailed from Maharashtra, India.

== Biography ==
Patwardhan was born in 1894 in Baroda. He studied in The M.C High School in Baroda. He obtained his bachelor's and master's degrees in 1916 and 1918, respectively, by specializing in the studies of Pharsi (Persian) and English literature. During 1918–1924, he taught Pharsi at Fergusson College in Pune, and after serving as a high school teacher for the next four years, he joined Rajaram College in Kolhapur to teach Pharsi there for the next eleven years (until his untimely death at age 45 in 1939).

In 1926, he published a Pharsi-Marathi dictionary. त्यांनी रवि किरण मंडळ माध्यमातून मराठी कवितेला प्रोत्साहन दिले. त्यांच्या आई कवितेला रसिकांनी खूप मोठा प्रतिसाद दिला. छंदोरचना हा त्यांचा पी एच डी चा प्रबंध जर्मनी मधील विद्यापीठात त्यांनी सादर केला असे ते केवळ एक आणि आजपर्यंत दुसऱ्या कोणीही असे करू शकले नाही असे मराठी कवी होते.

During his years at Rajaram College, Patwardhan wrote in Marathi a thesis titled Chhandorachana (छंदोरचना) and received for it a D.Litt. Degree from Mumbai University in 1939, a few months before his death. He was the first person in India to receive a doctorate in the field of Marathi literature.

Patwardhan presided over Marathi Sahitya Sammelan (मराठी साहित्य सम्मेलन) in Jalgaon in 1936.

== Poetry ==
Patwardhan was among pioneers like Keshavasuta, Govindagraj, and Bhaskar Ramchandra Tambe in Marathi literature who introduced romantic poetry to it and also introduced the themes of social and political reforms in Marathi poetry. They further introduced new forms of poetry writing in Marathi, including sonnets (सुनीते), gazals (गज़ल), and bhāvageete (भावगीते).

Patwardhan published ten collections of his poems. His first publication titled Wiraha-Taranga (विरह-तरंग) (1926) was a romantic Khandakāvya (खंडकाव्य) consisting of 234 shloka (श्लोक). His next publication titled Sudhāraka (सुधारक) (1928) contained his satirical 18-chapter khandakāvya with the theme of social reforms.

He translated Omar Khayyam's Rubaʿi (quatrain poems) into Marathi.

== The idea of linguistic purity ==
Patwardhan held the idea that Marathi writers must maintain linguistic "purity" in Marathi writing. He wrote a book titled BhashaShuddhi-Vivek (भाषाशुद्धि-विवेक) on that topic. He listed in it 1,200 words which were prevalent to different degrees in contemporary Marathi literature and which, he thought, ought not to be used any more in Marathi literature.

(In the above context, his inclusion in his poetry of some unusual words or word combinations like हृद्य मजा, खुर्चीसन्मुख, ज्वानीच्या अरुणोदयीं, and दुरत्यय वाग्यतता stands out, as also his choice of the pen name Madhav Julian with a "foreign" flavour. He might, however, have assumed the unusual pen name for the very sake of its unusualness.)

== Legacy ==
The Patwardhan Memorial Hall located at Maharashtra Sahitya Parishad was named after Patwardhan.
