= Sanjeev Khandekar =

Marathi writer

Sanjeev Khandekar is a reputed Marathi writer and visual artist based in Mumbai.

== Biography ==
He was born in 1958. Kavita (Granthali, 1990) a collection of his early poetry and Search Engine (Granthali, 2004). These collections have been followed by three volumes of poetry - All that I Wanna Do (Abhida Nantar, 2005), Mutatis Mutandis (2006) and Two Poems (2006). His two books, '1,2,3... Happy Galaxy' and collection of present poetry 'Smiles' (2007) was published by Abhida Nantar in 2007.

In 1982, he edited Sankalp: A collection of essays by social activists in Maharashtra. It was awarded the Marathi Sahitya Parishad award. His second book, the novel Ashant Parva (Season of Unrest, 1992), concerns itself with the construction of a politically sensitive self in post-industrial India.

With his solo exhibition of watercolours, Rumour of the Truth (2003), held in Mumbai, Chennai and Delhi, Khandekar occasioned the arrival of his pictorial vocabulary. In 2004, his installation entitled, FLEX- The Fluid Less Sex, was on display at an International fashion show in New Delhi. The following year he exhibited two installations, "All That I Wanna Do" and "La Peau de Chagrin", at Museum Art Gallery and Pundole Art Gallery respectively. And though the exhibitions were held concurrently and addressed the plangent landscape of capitalism, Khandekar approached both the exhibitions fortified with two distinctive registers.

In mid-2006 Tits n Clits n Elephant Dick, his exhibition of paintings, sculptures and installations held at Jehangir Art Gallery, with contributions from Vaishali Narkar, became controversial when the Mumbai Police stopped its public viewing. The installation was an inquiry into the conflicting realities of market driven societies and their peculiar cultural logic.

He concluded the year 2006, with a solo exhibition of his painting and installations, What do I love when I love you, my God? At The Fourth Floor gallery in Mumbai. The works attempted to underline a link between shopping bulimia and religious fundamentalism, a last-ditch strategy for late capitalist, consumer societies.

In 2007, he had another solo exhibition,'Kegel Exercises' (Aswani Mudra) at Pundole Art Gallery, Mumbai. He displayed marble inlay works, inlaid with share market ticker tape and its abstract distortions. The show also included 'Encore' audio installation.

Same year, i.e. in 2007. He had one more major show titled as 'Acquire, Merge or Collaborate..' At Ashish Balram Nagpal Galleries, Mumbai; exhibition his paintings and a sculpture. He used scanned electron micrographs (SEM) images and share market ticker tape numbers to obtain a unique motif.

In the year 2008 Sanjeev had an exhibition titled 'In Everything You Ever Wanted to Know about Bad Breath but were Afraid to Ask Alfred Hitchcock (Part I)'

In addition to these exhibitions Khandekar has partaken of several group and Web-based exhibitions. Khandekar has also written articles on environmental issues in various dailies and magazines. From 1990 to 1995, he edited the magazine Sujan, for an NGO of the same name.

Khandekar has worked on several international projects in senior managerial capacities, for both large Indian and multinational corporations.

== External links and references ==
- Death of the Search Engine At Museindia
- Profile at Museindia
- Saffronart artist profile

== Reviews ==
- A Review in Hindu
- A Reviewe on Art Concerns
