= B. S. Mardhekar =

Indian writer (1909–1956)

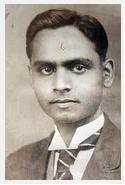
- Born: Bal Sitaram Mardhekar; 1 December 1909; Faizpur, India
- Died: 20 March 1956 (aged 46); Delhi, India
- Citizenship: India
- Education: B.A. English language and literature
- Alma mater: University of Mumbai
- Occupations: Poet, critic, dramatist, novelist, short-story writer
- Known for: Introducing modernism in Marathi
- Spouse(s): Homai Nulliseth, Anjana Mardhekar
- Awards: Sahitya Akademi Award

Bal Sitaram Mardhekar (1 December 1909 – 20 March 1956) was a Marathi writer who brought about a radical shift of sensibility in Marathi poetry. He was born in a town called Faizpur in the Khandesh region of Maharashtra.

He was educated in Pune and London, and worked at All India Radio until his death. His earlier collection of poems, Shishiragam (शिशिरागम), was a product of Ravi Kiran Mandal poetry: sentimental and lyrical. But his later avant-garde poetry brought about a storm in the Marathi literary world. His poem with the title "पिपात मेले ओल्या उंदिर" (Mice Died in the Wet Barrel) appeared in Abhiruchi (अभिरुची) magazine in 1946.

Similar to what Baudelaire did in French poetry, Mardhekar brought a decadent urban ethos into Marathi poetry. Marathi bhakti (भक्ति) poetry and the poetry of T. S. Eliot and W. H. Auden had an influence on him.

In 1948, he was charged and tried for obscenity for some of his poems in Kahi Kavita. He was declared innocent of these charges in 1952.

Mardhekar was also an influential critic and an experimental novelist. He attempted to bring in the stream of consciousness technique in Marathi novels.

He received in 1956 Sahitya Akademi Award for his work Saundarya ani Sahitya (A study of aesthetics) (सौंदर्य आणि साहित्य).

== Published works ==
=== Poetry ===
- Shishiragam (1939)
- Kahi Kavita (1947)
- Aankhin Kahi Kavita (1951)
- Kiti Tari Divsat
- Ala Ashadh Shravan

=== Novels ===
- Raatricha Divas (1942)
- Tambdi Maati (1943)
- Paani (1948)
- Mardhekaranchya Kadambarya (1962)

=== Aesthetics and Criticism ===
- Arts and Man (1937)
- Vangmaiyeen Mahaatmata (1941)
- Two Lectures on an Aesthetic of Literature (1944)
- Saundarya ani Sahitya (1955)

=== Plays ===
- Karna (1944)
- Natashreshta (1944)
- Sangam (1945)
- Aukshan (1946)
- Badakanche Gupit (1947)

=== Short stories ===
- Natashrestha Appasaheb Rele (1944)
