= Saleel Wagh =

Saleel Wagh is a Marathi poet, philosopher based in Pune.

== Biography ==
Saleel Wagh a Marathi poet, was born in 1967 in Rajkot, Gujarat. He has 7 collections of poetry on his credit. His collections include Nivadak Kavita (1996), Sadhyachya Kavita (2005), Aadhichya Kavita (2007) a Marathi translation of a major Hindi poet Shamsher Bahadur Singh (1911–1993), Blog Pahila, (a collection of critical articles on contemporary Marathi poetry), Racecourse aani Itar Kavita (2009), Junya Kavita (2010), UlatSulat (2011), Saheli Tijjan (2012), Talaleya Kavit (2018). His books Nivdak Kavita and Racecourse aani Iter Kavita, left deep impact on the contemporary Marathi literature, poetry in particular. He says, "poetry is cryptology and the poet is a cryptologist of culture". He was associated with Radical Humanist Association in the 1990s. He has been awarded ` Shabdavedh' Sanman for Marathi poetry for the year 2006. He has been also awarded prestigious 'Sahir Ludhiyanvi Sanman' in 2017 by Balraj Sahani Foundation.

== Bibliography ==
Poetry Collections

- Nivadak Kavita
- Aadhichya Kavita
- Sadhyachya Kavita
- Racecourse Ani Itar kavita (2008)
- Junya kavita (2010)
- Ulatsulat (2011)
- Nyari Nyari Diwangi- Saheli Tijjan (2011)
- Talalelya Kavita (2018)

Translation

- Samsher Bahadur Singhchya Kavita

== Online Poems ==
- Poem No. Zero
- Two poems at Museindia
