= Keshavasuta =

Indian poet (1866–1905)

Keshavasut Krishnaji Damle
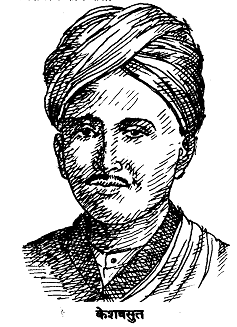
- Born: Krishnaji Keshav Damle; 7 October 1866; Malgund, Bombay Presidency, British India
- Died: 7 November 1905 (aged 39); Hubbali, British India
- Monuments: The Memorial of Keshavasuta, Malgund
- Other name: Keshavasut
- Occupation: Poet
- Works: Tutari; Aamhi Kon ?
- Children: 3
- Parent(s): Keshav Vitthal Damle (father); Annapurna Damle (mother)

Keshavasut (born Krishnaji Keshav Damle; 7 October 1866 – 7 November 1905) was a Marathi poet who is regarded as the pioneer of modern Marathi poetry. He wrote around 135 poems during his lifetime. In addition to his Marathi works, he wrote poetry in English and authored a play that remained unpublished.

== Early life and education ==
Keshavasuta was born on 7 October 1866 in Malgund, Ratnagiri. He completed his education in several locations, including Khed, Baroda, Wardha, Nagpur, and Pune. He was married in 1880 while he was still a student. In 1889, he passed his matriculation examination.

== Career ==
After completing his matriculation, Keshavasuta worked various temporary jobs. Following the outbreak of a plague epidemic in Mumbai, he relocated to the Khandesh region. He initially worked as a teacher at a municipal school in Bhadgaon. He later served as the headmaster of a school in Faizpur. In 1904, he took a position as a Marathi teacher at a government school in Dharwad. He died in Hubli, Karnataka, on 7 November 1905.

== Literary work ==
Although Keshavasuta began writing poetry in his childhood, his active period as a "true poet" is considered to be between 1885 and 1905. The pen name "Keshavasuta" was bestowed upon him by Narayan Phadnis, the editor of the monthly magazine Kavyaratnavali, and it was under this name that his work became known to the public.

=== Style and themes ===
Keshavasuta's poetry represented a departure from traditional Marathi poetry. His style was described as somewhat rough, lacking the rhetorical flourishes common among the earlier scholarly poets. He experimented with meter, favoring matraganavrttas over aksharaganavrttas, and introduced new rhymes. He is credited with being the first to introduce the sonnet form from English literature into Marathi poetry.

His work was influenced more by English rhythmic poets such as Wordsworth, Shelley, and Keats than by Sanskrit or traditional Marathi predecessors. His poems explored themes of self-discovery, nature, social rebellion, and interpersonal relationships. His writing reflected a free-spirited attitude that revolutionized Marathi poetry and influenced future generations. His philosophical foundation relied on principles of freedom, equality, brotherhood, and humanism.

=== Notable works ===
Keshavasuta's poems covered diverse subjects:

- Nature: Poems such as Beetle (1890), Flower Leaf (1892), and Butterfly (1900) depict elements of nature.
- Social rebellion: His revolutionary social views are evident in works like Tutari (1893), Nava Shipai (1898), and Gofan Keli Chan (1905).
- Mysticism: He wrote poems reflecting mysterious experiences and enlightenment, the most popular being Zapurza. Other poems in this genre include Mhatari (1901) and Harpale Shrey (1905).

== Legacy ==
Keshavasuta's collection of poems was published posthumously in 1916 by Hari Narayan Apte. He is cited as a major influence on subsequent poets, including Govindagraj, Balkavi, Rendalkar, and Kavyavihari, who considered themselves his disciples. In 1966, the Government of Maharashtra celebrated his birth centenary.

== Legacy ==
- A memorial has been erected at Keshavasuta birthplace Malgund in his honour.
- Keshavasut's poem Tutari is seen in the soundtrack of the Oscar-nominated film Harishchandrachi Factory.
- On 22 May 2017, the Dadar-Sawantwadi Rajya Rani Express was named as Tutari Express to mark the centenary of Damle's famed poem titled Tutari.
