= Hemant Divate =

Marathi poet

Hemant Divate is a Marathi poet, editor, translator and publisher based in Mumbai.

== Biography ==
Hemant Divate is a poet, editor, publisher, translator and festival director.

He is the author of eight poetry collections in Marathi. His most recent book in Marathi is Paranoia, awarded by Govt. of Maharashtra’s Kavi Keshavsut Purskar. Divate’s poems have been translated into 30 international languages. In translation, he has a book in Spanish, Irish, Arabic, German, Kannada and Estonian, apart from four in English. His poems figure in numerous anthologies in Marathi, English and Slovenian.

He is the founder-editor of the Marathi little magazine Abhidha Nantar. AbhidhaNantar has been credited for providing a solid platform to new poets and for enriching the post-nineties Marathi literary scene. Divate is credited with changing the Marathi literary scene through AbhidhaNantar and the Indian English poetry scene through his imprint Poetrywala.

Divate has participated in numerous international poetry and literature festivals across the globe. His publishing house, Paperwall Publishing has published (under its imprint Poetrywala) more than 150 poetry collections.

Hemant is the founder and director of the Mumbai Poetry Festival. Hemant lives and works in Mumbai.

Also by Hemant Divate

Poetry in Marathi Chautishiparyantchya Kavita : 2001 Thambtach Yet Nahi: 2006 Ya Roommadhye Aale Ki Life Suru Hote : 2012 Reloaded: 2015 Paranoia: 2020

Translations Les Murraychya Kavita: 2008 Zingonia Zingonechya Kavita : 2014 Walk by Mustansir Dalvi: 2021

Poetry in translation English | Virus Alert (tr. Dilip Chitre): 2003 English | A Depressingly Monotonous Landscape (tr. Sarabjeet Garcha): 2012 Spanish | Alarma de Virus (tr. Zingonia Zingone) : 2012 Irish | Foláireamh Víris (tr. Gabriel Rosenstock) : 2012 English | Struggles With Imagined Gods (tr. Mustansir Dalvi): 2013 English | Selected Poems (tr. Dilip Chitre, Mustansir Dalvi, Sarabjeet Garcha): 2015,2017 Estonian | Selected Poems (tr. Mathura Lattik): 2016 فضا ٌء رتي ٌب يبع ُث على الكآب | Arabic Butterflies | (tr. Ashraf Aboul-Yazid Dali) : 2017 German | Eingenistet in meinen Gedanken (tr. Andrea Steinauer) : 2017

Man without a navel (Edited by Mustansir Dalvi): 2018, 2021, 2023

== Bibliography ==
- Chautishi Paryentchya Kavita
- Virus Alert. translated by Dilip Chitre.
- Thambtach Yet Nahi
- Poems of Les Murray ( translated into Marathi)
- Ya Roommadhe Aale Ki Life Suru Hote
- A Depressingly Monotonous Landscape translated by Sarabjeet Garcha
- Alarma De Virus translation of Virus Alert into Spanish by Zingonia Zingone
- Foláireamh Víris translation of Virus Alert into Gaelic/Irish by Gabriel Rosenstock
- "Zingonia Zingonechya Kavita" translated from Spanish/English into Marathi
- "Reloaded" Selected poems in Marathi original (1990-2015) published by Poetrywala
- "Selected Poems: 1990-2015" in English Translation published by Poetrywala
- "Man without a Navel" Selected Translations edited by Mustansir Dalvi published by Poetrywala (An imprint of Paperwall Media & Publishing Pvt. Ltd.) available at (http://www.paperwall.in)
