= Mangesh Narayanrao Kale =

Indian writer and editor

- Occupations: Poet, editor, artist
- Writing career
- Pen name: Mangesh Kale
- Genres: Poetry, criticism, fiction

Mangesh Narayanrao Kale is an Indian poet, artist, and editor.

== Career ==
As a journalist, Kale started his career with the Marathi daily paper Marathwada. Later he started own daily, Khandesh. He is the editor of Khel, a Marathi literary magazine that has been involved with the Marathi literary movement for over a decade. His published works include Mangesh Narayanrao Kalechi Kavita (2001), Shaktipatache Sutra (2004), Naal Tutalya Pratham Purushache Drishtaant (2007) and Thus, It's Just Shape Of Poem (2007, translated from the original Marathi).

== Bibliography ==
- Mangesh Narayanrao Kalechi Kavita (Marathi), 2001
- Shaktipaatache Sutra (Marathi) 2004
- Naal Tutelya Pratham Purushache Drishtaant (Marathi), 2007-Abhidhanantar
- It's Just Shape of Poem (English translation of his Marathi poetry) 2007
- Tritiya Purushache Aagman (Marathi) 2010-Abhidhanantar

== Awards ==
In 2006, Kale was a recipient of the Yashwantrao Chavan Kharad Puraskar, a Marathi literature award, for Shaktipatache Sutra. He won the Maharashtra Foundation Award for his poetry collection Trutiya Purushache Aagman in 2011.
