= Dilip Chitre =

Indian Marathi and English poet (1938–2009)

- Born: 17 September 1938; Baroda, Baroda State, British India
- Died: 10 December 2009 (aged 71); Pune, Maharashtra, India
- Occupations: Poet, translator, painter, fiction writer, critic, film maker
- Spouse: Vijoo Chitre
- Children: Ashay Chitre
- Writing career
- Movement: Indian Modernism postmodernism

Dilip Purushottam Chitre (17 September 1938 – 10 December 2009) was one of the foremost Indian poets and critics to emerge in the post Independence India. Apart from being a notable bilingual writer, writing in Marathi and English, he was also a teacher, a painter, a filmmaker and a magazine columnist.

== Biography ==
Chitre was born in Baroda on 17 September 1938 into a Marathi speaking CKP community. His father Purushottam Chitre used to publish a periodical named Abhiruchi. His grandfather, Kashinath Gupte was an expert on Tukaram and this served as Chitre's introduction to the poet. Chitre's family moved to Mumbai in 1951 and he published his first collection of poems in 1960. He was one of the earliest and the most important influences behind the famous "little magazine movement" of the sixties in Marathi. He started Shabda with Arun Kolatkar and Ramesh Samarth. In 1975, he was awarded a visiting fellowship by the International Writing Programme of the University of Iowa in Iowa City, Iowa in the United States. He has also worked as a director of the Indian Poetry Library, archive, and translation centre at Bharat Bhavan, a multi arts foundation. He also convened a world poetry festival in New Delhi followed by an international symposium of poets in Bhopal. He was educated both in Baroda and Mumbai.

After a long bout with cancer, Dilip Chitre died at his residence in Pune on 10 December 2009.

== Works ==
=== Poetry ===
Chitre was a bilingual writer, but wrote mostly in Marathi. His Ekun Kavita or Collected Poems were published in the 1990s in three volumes. As Is, Where Is selected English poems (1964–2007) and "Shesha" English translation of selected Marathi poems, both published by Poetrywala, were published in 2007. He also edited An Anthology of Marathi Poetry (1945–1965). He was an accomplished translator of prose and poetry. His most famous translation was of the celebrated 17th century Marathi bhakti poet Tukaram (published as Says Tuka). He translated Anubhavamrut by twelfth century bhakti poet Dnyaneshwar. He also wrote poetry in English. Travelling in a Cage (1980) was his first and only book of English poems.

Exile, alienation, self-disintegration and death are major themes in Chitre's poetry, which belongs essentially to the Modernist Movement. It reflects cosmopolitan culture, urban sensibilities, uses oblique expressions and ironic tones.

=== Films ===
He started his professional film career in 1969 and made one feature film, about a dozen documentary films, several short films and about 20 video documentary features. He wrote the scripts of most of his films as well as directed or co-directed them. He also scored the music for some of them.

== Awards and honors ==
Among Chitre's honours and awards are several Maharashtra State Awards, the Prix Special du Jury for his film Godam at the Festival des Trois Continents in 1984, the Ministry of Human Resource Development's Emeritua Fellowship, the University of Iowa's International Writing Program Fellowship, the Indira Gandhi Fellowship, and the Villa Waldberta Fellowship for residence given by the City of Munich, Bavaria, Germany. He was a D.A.A.D. (German Academic Exchange) Fellow and Writer-in-Residence at the Universities of Heidelberg and Bamberg in Germany in 1991–92. He was Director of Vagarth, Bharat Bhavan Bhopal and convenor-director of the Valmiki World Poetry Festival (New Delhi,1985) and International Symposium of Poets (Bhopal, 1985), a Keynote Speaker at the World Poetry Congress in Maebashi, Japan (1996) and at the Ninth International Conference on Maharashtra at Saint Paul, Minnesota, USA in 2001 and Member of the International Jury at the Literature festival Berlin, 2001.

He was member of a three-writer delegation (along with Nirmal Verma and U. R. Ananthamurthy) to the Soviet Union (Russia, Ukraine, and Georgia), Hungary, the Federal Republic of Germany and France in the spring and summer of 1980 and to the Frankfurter Buchmesse in Frankfurt, Germany in 1986.

He was Honorary President of the Sontheimer Cultural Association, of which he was also a Founder-Trustee.

== Bibliography ==
=== In Marathi ===
- Kavita, Mouj Prakashan, Mumbai, 1960
- Orpheus, Mouj Prakashan, Mumbai,1968; 2nd Ed: Shabdalay Prakashan, Srirampur,2010
- Sheeba Raneechya Shodhaat, Majestic Prakashan, Mumbai,1969
- Kavitenantarchyaa Kavita, Vacha Prakashan, Aurangabad,1978
- Chaavyaa; Pras Prakashan, Mumbai, 1983
- Dahaa By Dahaa, Pras Prakashan, Mumbai, 1983
- Mithu Mithu Porat ani Sutak, Saket Prakashan, Aurangabad,1989
- Tirkas Ani Chaukas, Lok Vangmay Griha, Mumbai;1980;2nd Ed: Shabdalay Prakashan, Srirampur,2010
- Punha Tukaram, S.K.Belvalkar, Pune, 1990; 2nd edition: Popular Prakashan, Mumbai, 1995; 3rd edition:Popular Prakashan, Mumbai, 2001
- Shatakaanchaa Sandhikaal, Lok Vangmay Griha, Mumbai
- Bhau Padhye Yanchyaa Shreshtha Kathaa ( Editor), Lok Vangmay Griha, Mumbai, 1995
- Ekoon Kavita-1, Popular Prakashan, Mumbai, 1992; 2nd edition:1995
- Ekoon Kavita-2, Popular Prakashan; Mumbai;1995
- Ekoon Kavita-3, Popular Prakashan; Mumbai
- Chaturang, Popular Prakashan, Mumbai;1995
- Tukobache Vaikunthagaman, Shabdalay Prakashan, Srirampur,2010
- Agatikanche Jaagatikikaran, Shabdalay Prakashan, Srirampur,2010
- Kavi Kai Kaam Karto(in Gujarati and English translation), Poetrywala, Mumbai,2010

=== In English ===
- An Anthology of Marathi Poetry (1945–1965) (Editor), Nirmala-Sadanand, Mumbai, 1968
- Ambulance Ride, Self, Mumbai, 1972
- Travelling in a Cage; Clearing House; Mumbai; 1980
- The Reasoning Vision: Jehangir Sabavala’s Painterly Universe, Introduction and Notes on the paintings by Dilip Chitre
- Tata-McGraw-Hill, New Delhi, 1980
- Says Tuka: Translation of Tukaram, Penguin, 1991
- Tender Ironies: A Tribute To Lothar Lutze (Editor), Manohar, New Delhi, 1994
- Shri Jnandev’s Anubhavamrut: The Immortal Experience of Being, Sahitya Akademi, New Delhi, 1996
- The Mountain, Vijaya Chitre, Pune, 1998
- No-Moon Monday On The River Karha, Vijaya Chitre, Pune, 2000
- Virus Alert: Poems of Hemant Divate,( as translator) Mumbai: Poetrywala, 2003
- Namdeo Dhasal: Poet of the Underground: Poems 1972–2006 (as Translator), Navayana Publishing, Chennai, 2007
- As Is, Where Is: Selected Poems, Poetrywala, Mumbai, 2008
- Shesha: Selected Marathi poems in English Translation, Poetrywala, Mumbai, 2008
- Felling of the Banyan Tree
- Father Returning Home

=== In Hindi ===
- Pisati ka Burz: Dileep Chitre ki Chuni Huvi Kavitaayen, translated by Chandrakant Deotale, Rajkamal, New Delhi, 1987

=== In Gujarati ===
- Milton-na Mahaakaavyo, translated by Yashwant Dashi and the author, Parichay Pustakavali, Mumbai, 1970
- Kavya Vishva Shreni: Marathi: Dileep Chitre, translated by Jaya Mehta, Gujarat Sahitya Academy, Gandhinagar

=== In German ===
- Das Fallen des Banyanbaums, translated by Lothar Lutze, Botschaft der Bundesrepublik Deutschland, New Delhi, 1980
- Bombay/Mumbai: Bilder einer Mega-Stadt (with Henning Stegmuller and Namdeo Dhasal) translated by Lothar Lutze, A-1 Verlag, Munchen
- Worte des Tukaram, Translated by Lothar Lutze, A=1 Verlag, Munchen
- Lotos Blatter 1: Dilip Chitre: Aus dem Englischen und dem Marathi, translated by Lothar Lutze, Proben Indische Poesie: Lotos Verlag Roland Beer; Berlin, 2001

=== Paintings and exhibitions ===
- 1969, First One Man Show of Oil Paintings; Bombay; India;
- 1975, Triple Triptych; in collaboration with Peter Clarke and Ahmed Muhammad Imamovic; Iowa City, Iowa; USA;
- Participation in group shows in India and the Netherlands;
- Dilip Chitre 63: Mini-Retrospective of Paintings in Pune (1986–2001); Studio S, Pune;2001;
- In the collection of Air-India International, Bombay, India;

=== Filmography and videography ===
- Vijeta, produced by Filmvalas, Mumbai, directed by Govind Nihalani; story and screenplay
- Godam, produced by the National Film Development Corporation, Mumbai; screenplay, direction, and music
- Ardha Satya, directed by Govind Nihalani; theme poem
- A Tryst With Destiny, produced by S.S. Oberoi; script and direction
- Education '72, produced by S.S. Oberoi; script and direction
- A Question of Identity, produced by Y.R.Khandekar; script, direction, and narration
- Dattu, produced by Dnyada Naik; script and direction
- Made in India, producer, scriptwriter, and director, on behalf of the Industrial Design Centre, Indian Institute of Technology, Powai, Mumbao
- Bombay:Geliebte Moloch, produced by Adanos-Film, gmbh, Munich, Germany; Co-Scriptwriter and C-Director; Videofilms Made For The Archives of Bharat Bhavan, Bhopal (1984–85)
- Shakti Chattopadhyaya: Portrait of the Poet, produced by Bharat Bhavan, Bhopal; Concept, Script, and Direction
- Translating Shakti Chattopadhyaya into English: a discussion with Jyotirmoy Datta and Arvind Krishna Meherotra, concept and direction, produced by Bharat Bhavan, Bhopal
- Translating Shakti Chattopadhyaya into Hindi a discussion with Kedar Nath Singh and Prayag Shukla, concept and direction
- Shamsher Bahadur Singh: A Portrait of the Poet, concept and direction
- Shamsher Bahadur Singh in discussion with Namvar Singh and Ashok Vajpeyi, Concept and Direction, produced by Bharat Bhavan Bhopal
- K.Satchidanandan: A Portrait of the Poet and a discussion by Sudha Gopalakrishnan and Rajendra Dhodapkar, concept and direction, produced by Bharat Bhavan, Bhopal
- In The Darkness of the Twentieth Century: A discussion featuring Shrikant, Verma, Namvar Singh, and Ashok Vajpeyi, concept and direction, produced by Bharat Bhavan, Bhopal
- Kunwar Narayan: A Portrait of the Poet, Concept and Direction, produced by Bharat Bhavan, Bhopal
- B.C.Sanyal: Memories of Life and Art at 82, concept and direction; for Sahitya Akademi, New Delhi
- Narayan Surve: A Poet of The Proliterait (in Marathi, Hindi, and English versions), 2000

=== Editor ===
- Shabda (1954–1960), Mumbai
- New Quest (1978–1980), (2001–), Mumbai

=== Columnist ===
- The Free Press Journal, Mumbai (1959–1960)
- Loksatta, Mumbai
- Dinank, Mumbai
- Ravivar Sakal, Pune
- Quest
- New Quest
- Abhiruchi

=== Occasional book reviewer/contributor of articles ===
- The Indian Express
- The Times of India
- Sakaal Times
- Quest
- New Quest
- Granth
- The Illustrated Weekly of India
- Times Weekly
- Biblio
- Gallery
- Kala-Varta
- Sakshatkar
- Poorvagraha

== Online Poetry ==
- At Poetry International Web
- At Muse India
- at Kavitayan
- Childhood
- Haikus
- Rape of Gujarat
- Ode to Bombay
- Frescos on Little Mag
- Hindi Translations of some poems at Pratilipi
- Poems from Shesha
- Gujarati translations of some poems by Hemang Desai
