= Atie =

Atie may refer to:

- Atie Voorbij (born 1940), a Dutch butterfly swimmer
- Atie Ridder-Visser (1914–2014), a Dutch resistance fighter during World War II
- Attie (disambiguation)
- Attiyah (disambiguation)
