= Subversive Festival =

Festival in Zagreb, Croatia

- Subversive Festival logo
- Location: Zagreb, Croatia
- Founded: 2008
- Awards: The Wild Dreamer
- Language: English, Croatian
- Website: http://www.subversivefestival.com/

The Subversive Festival is an annual international fortnight of political, activist, cultural, educational, literary and artistic events that takes place in Zagreb, Croatia every May. Its activities are divided into the Subversive Film Festival (which was the official name of the festival until 2011), the Subversive Forum, the Balkan Forum and the Subversive Book Fair. The cross-cutting activity is the Subversive Festival's Conference that includes major keynote lectures and round tables held in Cinema Europe.

== Origin and history ==
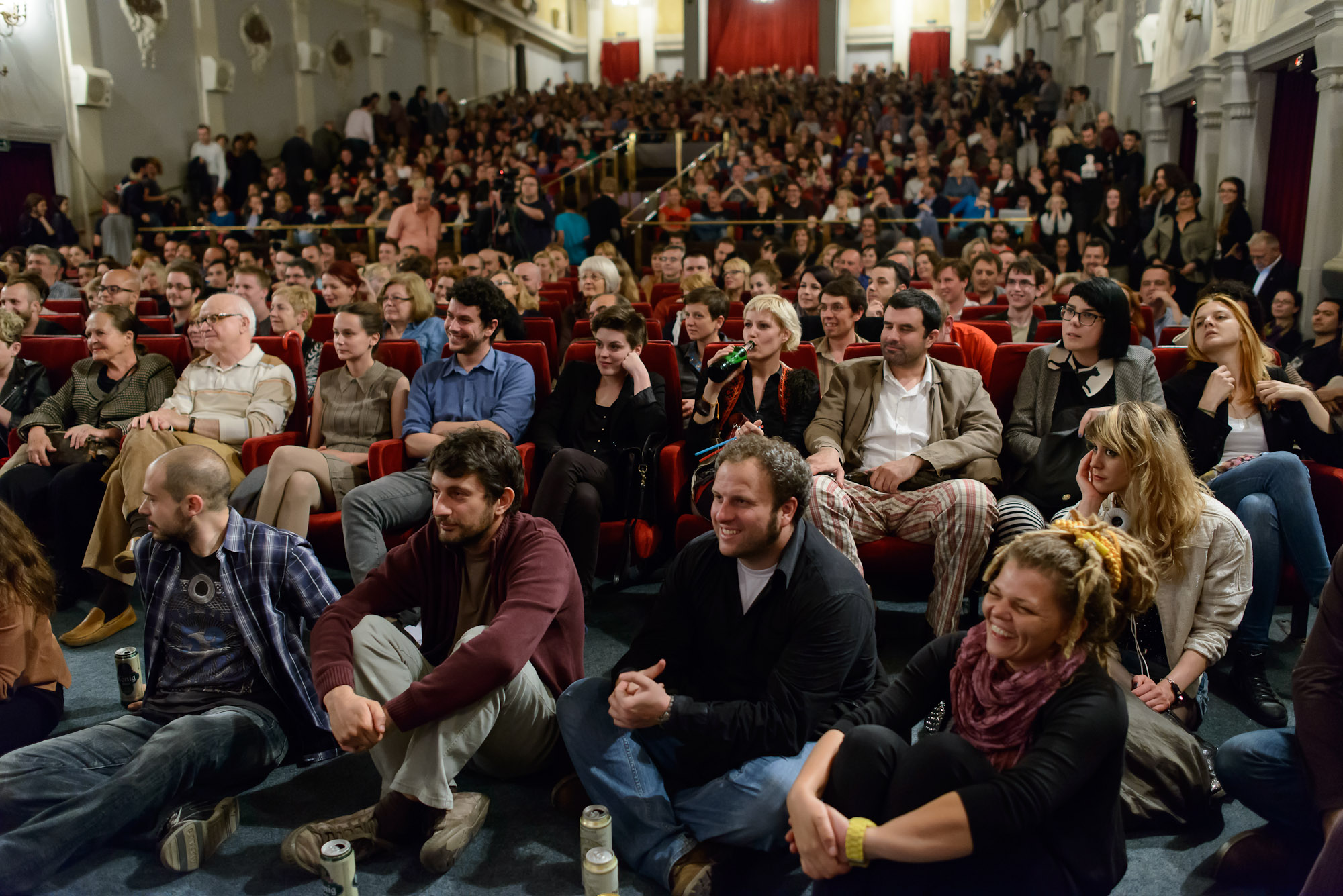
Audience at the Festival

Year	Topic
2008	Hommage to '68
2009	China 1949-2009
2010	Socialism
2011	Decolonization
2012	The Future of Europe
2013	The Utopia of Democracy
2014	Power & Freedom - in the time of control
2015	Spaces of Emancipation - Micropolitics and Rebellions
2016	Politics of Friendship
2017	The European Left Against the New World (Dis)order
2018	Struggle for Freedom and Poetic Justice
2019	Europe on the Edge
2020	Creative Disobedience
2021	A Post-COVID Democracy

The Festival was initially founded as the Subversive Film Festival in 2008 which celebrated the 40th anniversary of the protests of 1968. The initial edition of the festival included screening of the films by Chris Marker and Jean-Luc Godard as well as public lectures by Slavoj Žižek, Ernesto Laclau, Chantal Mouffe and others. Each edition of the festival has an overarching theme that invites critical examination and public debates. In 2009 the Festival was dedicated to China, in the context of the 60th anniversary of the Communist Revolution, whereas in 2010 its theme was the history, present and future of the idea of socialism.

Following the "Arab Spring", the 2011 edition was dedicated to decolonisation as well as to new social movements. The situation in the European Union prompted the organisers in 2012 to tackle "The Future of Europe", whereas the major theme of 2013's "The Utopia of Democracy" responded to the rise of global movements demanding real democracy, participation and social justice. Che Guevara's daughter Aleida was one of the guests in 2013, as well as Alexis Tsipras, the head of Greece's leftist SYRIZA parliamentary group, both taking part in debates at the festival.

In 2013 Srećko Horvat and Igor Štiks left the Subversive Festival together with other members of the program team, "due to differences in understanding the goals and direction of the activist platforms within Subversive Forum and, more generally, the general purpose of Subversive Festival". From 2014 onwards it has been run by a different team.

In 2021, after the 2019 closure of the festival's primary venue Europe Cinema, the event moved to four venues and streamed online.

== Festival sections ==
Subversive Festival has several sections.

=== The Subversive Film Festival ===
Pre 2012 logo of the festival

In 2011 the Subversive Film Festival, originally the core of the festival, became one of many festival sections.

The film festival consists of a selection of films according to their relation to the main theme of that year's Festival (e.g. 1968, China, Socialism, Decolonisation, Europa Incognita, Utopia of Democracy), retrospectives of acknowledged leftist film authors and panel discussions between film theoreticians and filmmakers.

The most notable film retrospectives so far include an overview of the revolutionary films of the 1960s and 1970s, a selection of Chinese film classics and contemporary films, a major retrospective of Yugoslav cinema (curated by Sergio Germani Grmek) and a selection of contemporary Third World cinema.

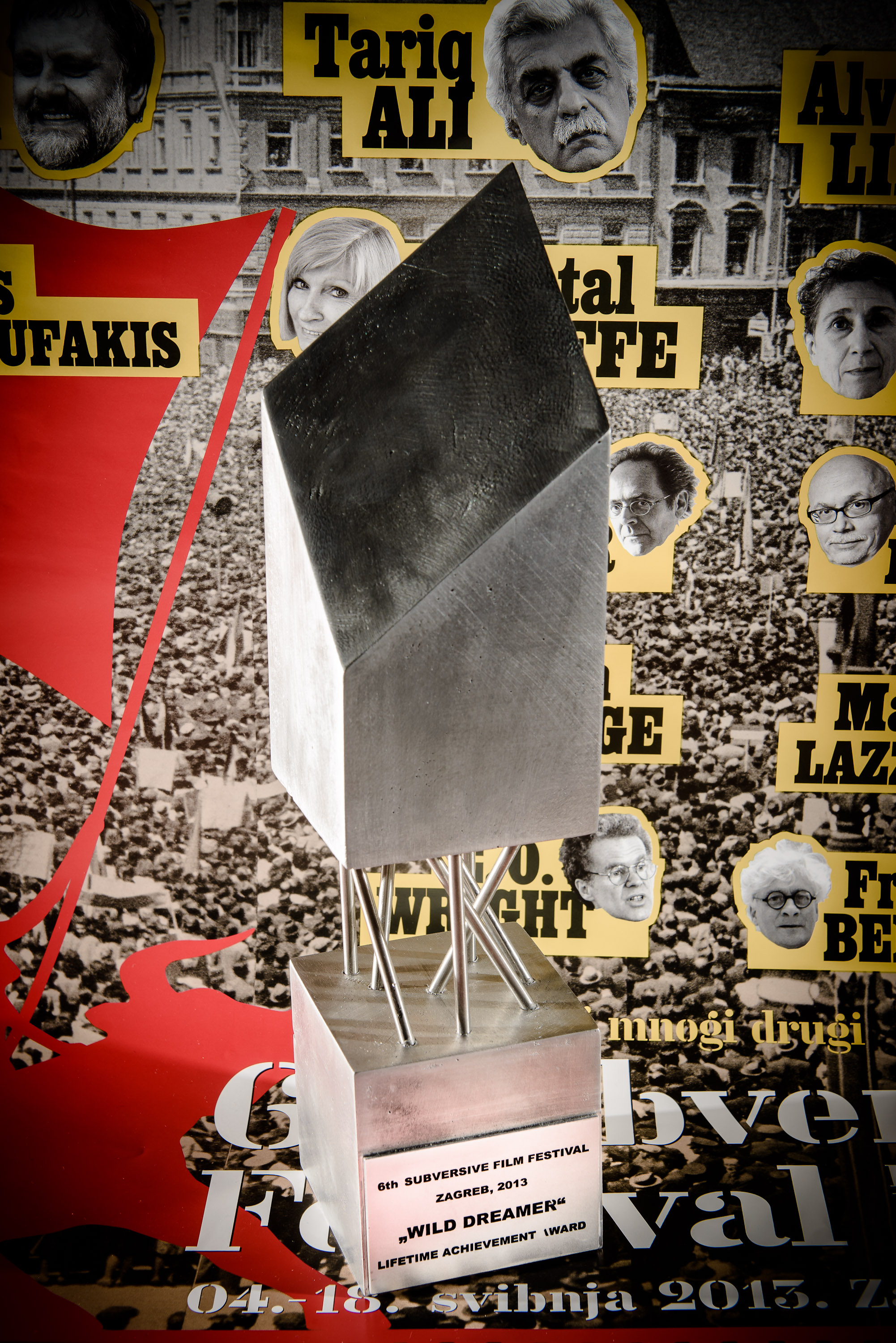
Wild Dreamer Award

The sixth edition of the Subversive Film Festival (in 2013) introduced competition categories for contemporary European and international films, selected by the artistic director Dragan Rubeša. The first Wild Dreamer Award for Lifetime Achievement was given to Oliver Stone, whose latest 10-hour-long series the Untold History of the United States was shown in the main film programme. The Wild Dreamer for Best Documentary Film went to Italian director Daniele Vicari for La nave dolce. The Land of Hope by Japanese director Shion Sono, a story about a family whose father refuses to evacuate his sick wife from a radiation affected area, won the Best Feature Award. French filmmaker Sylvain George's Vers Madrid (en. The Burning Bright!), which documents demonstrations of the 15-M grassroots protest movement in Spain, was voted Best Film by the audience.

=== The Subversive Forum ===
The Subversive Forum is a leftist and progressive event that established itself as an open platform for different and even opposing positions. The Subversive Forum is not connected to any political party but it attracts individuals of various political stripes on the progressive left and is related to almost all significant Croatian, post-Yugoslav and Balkans social movements – from student movements, trade unions, feminist organisations, the Right to the City movements, green and LGBT activists etc. The Subversive Forum has been supported by the World Social Forum as an official event of the WSF. According to the organizers, the Subversive forum has become "one of the key European mobilisation points for activists and intellectuals from the region and the world, thinking jointly how to build better social systems"

=== The Balkan Forum ===
The Balkan Forum was established in 2012 as the platform for cooperation for pan-Balkan social and political movements and organisations from 10 post-socialist countries (Slovenia, Croatia, Bosnia and Herzegovina, Serbia, North Macedonia, Albania, Bulgaria, Romania, Montenegro, and with strong participation from Hungary). The conclusions of the First Balkan Forum highlighted a need for stronger cooperation among these movements as well as for joint action across the peninsula. A huge number of activists gathered in 2012 and 2013 to discuss topics relevant to the region, including neoliberal policies, rampant privatisation, the defense of the Commons, student and workers movements, sex and gender equality, social change, as well as the questions of democratisation and participation, the media and public sphere, and alternative economic models.

The Balkan Forum includes both self-organised sessions by movements and organisations themselves as well as plenary sessions.

== Networks and influence ==
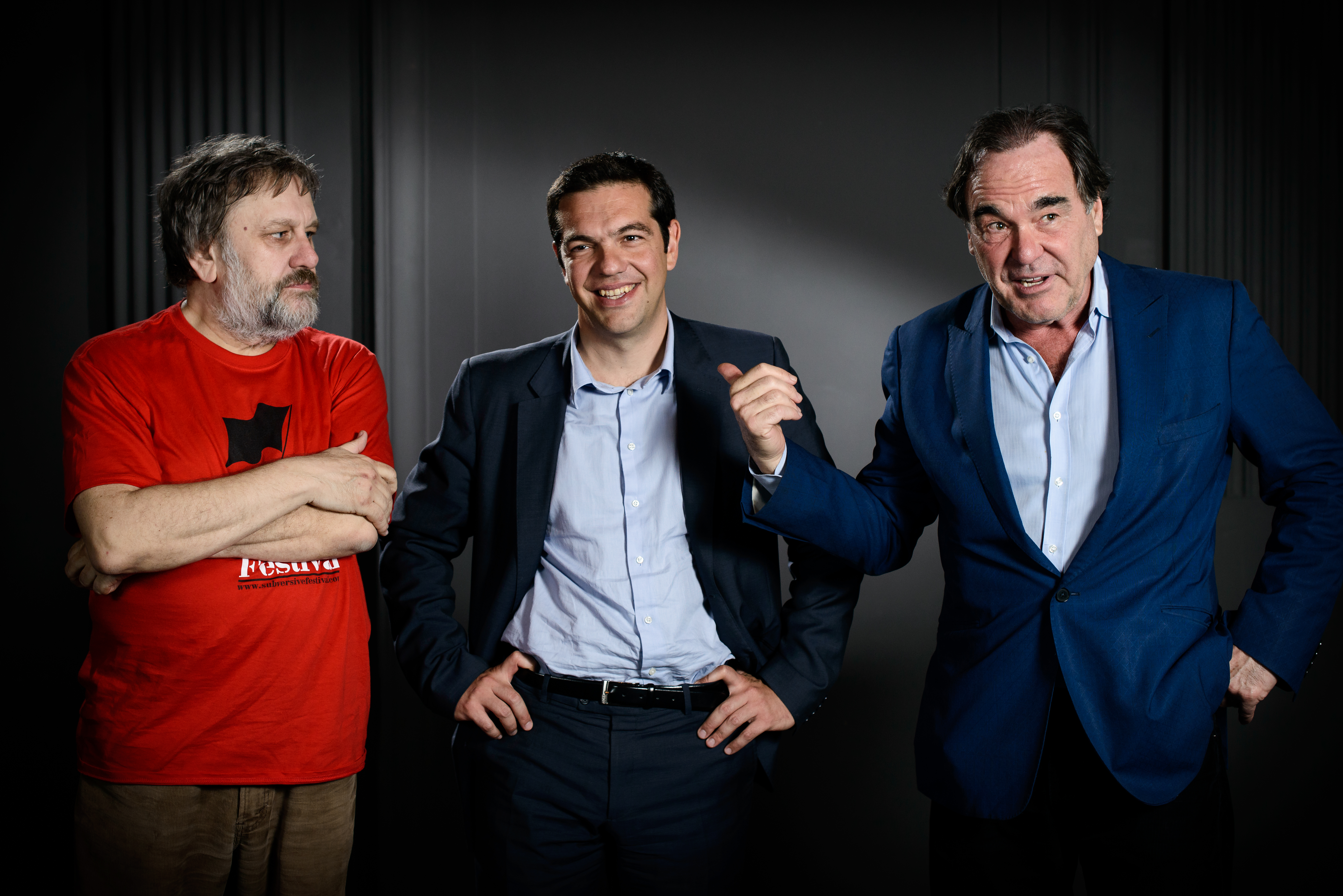
Slavoj Žižek, Alexis Tsipras and Oliver Stone at 2013 Subversive Festival

The Subversive Festival established strong ties with the World Social Forum, The World Forum of Alternatives, Transform! Europe Network, Attac, Rosa Luxemburg Stiftung, Heinrich Böll Foundation and similar international organisations.

The events at the Subversive Festival are usually reported by local and international media (Al Jazeera, Croatian Television, Slovenian Television, Arte TV, etc.). The Festival benefits from special media support by media sharing its political vision such as le Monde Diplomatique, La Memoire des Luttes, Transeuropeennes, Zarez, Critic Attac, etc.

The 6th edition of the Subversive Festival provoked special attention since it took place just before Croatia's accession to the EU. In this context, the visit of the head of the Greek opposition Syriza Alexis Tsipras and film director Oliver Stone was particularly followed both by local audience and international media. A joke made by Slavoj Žižek during the public debate with Tsipras provoked a controversy in Greece.

== Notable guests ==
The Festival's conference attracts thousands of visitors from all over the world. Many prominent intellectuals have given keynote lectures and participated in public debates, including Slavoj Žižek, Oliver Stone, Alexis Tsipras, Tariq Ali, Aleida Guevara, Terry Eagleton, Gayatri Spivak, Michael Hardt, Antonio Negri, Saskia Sassen, Wang Hui, Minqi Li, Karl-Heinz Dellwo, David Harvey, Erik Olin Wright, Bernard Stiegler, Franco Berardi, Karl-Markus Gauss, Renata Salecl, Boris Buden, Dubravka Ugrešić, Želimir Žilnik, Aleš Debeljak, Samir Amin etc.

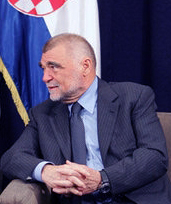
Stipe Mesić

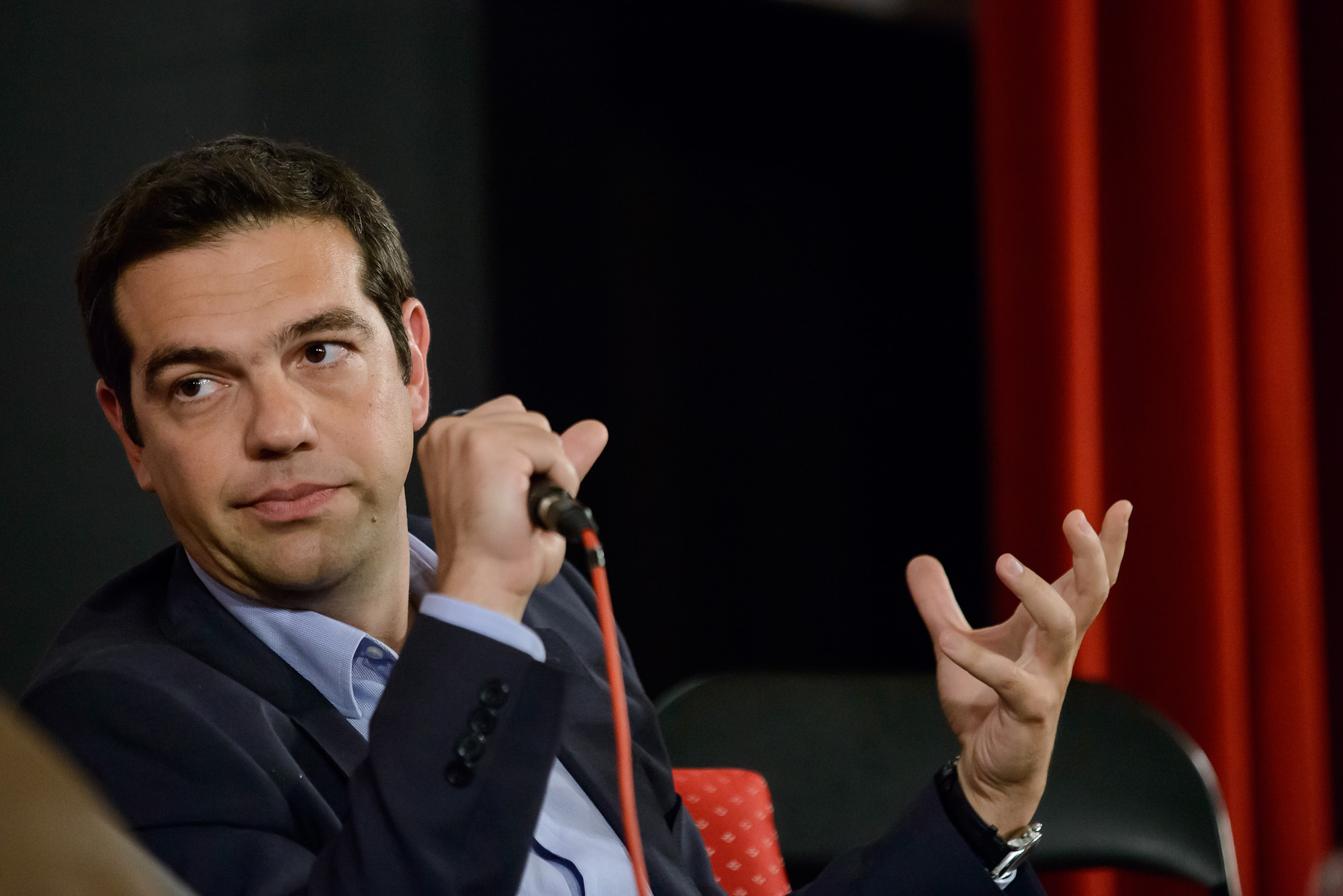
Alexis Tsipras

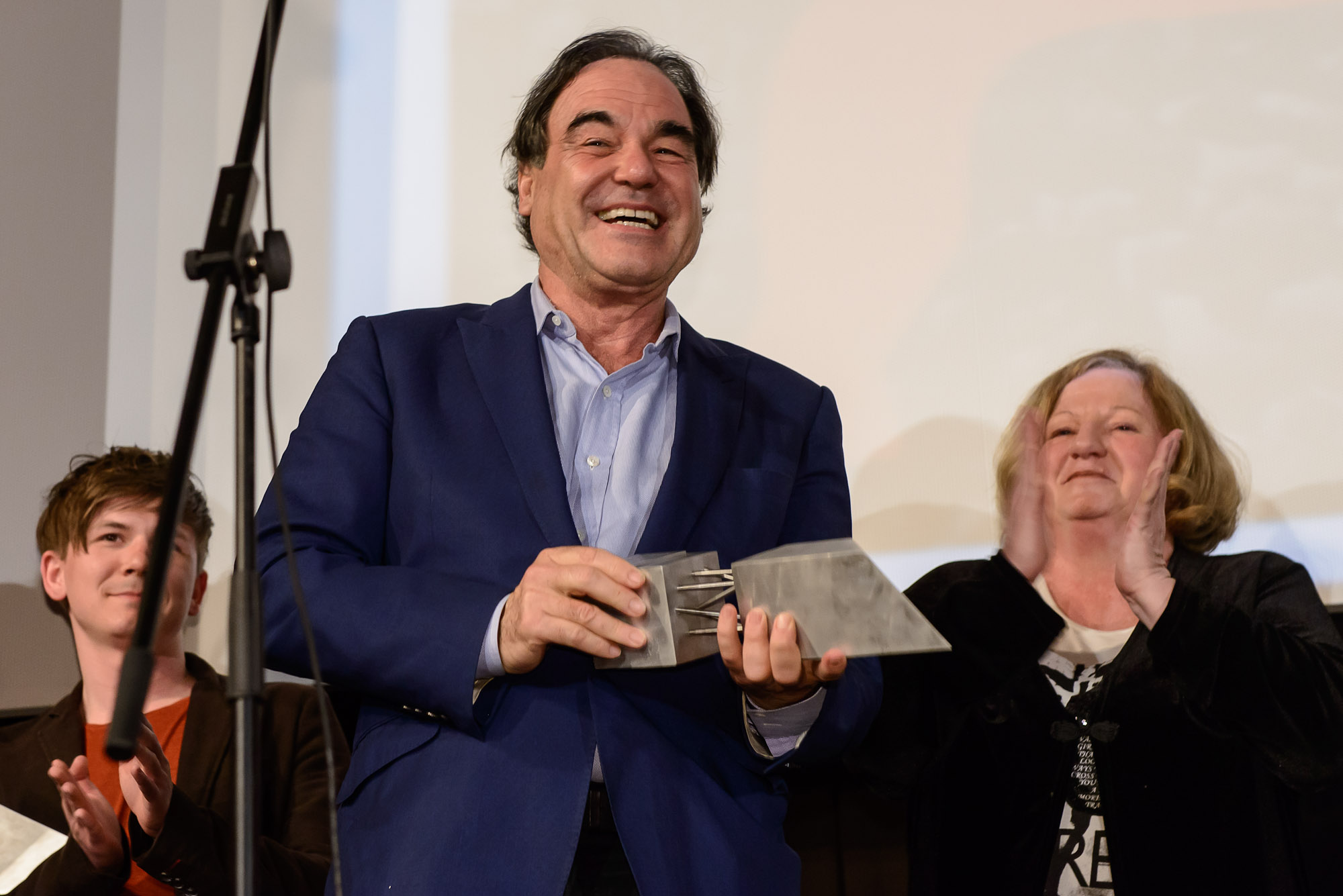
Oliver Stone

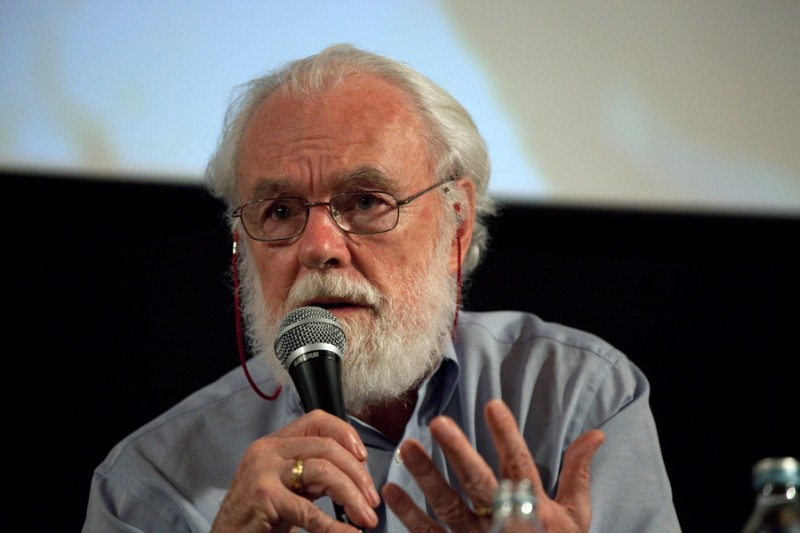
David Harvey

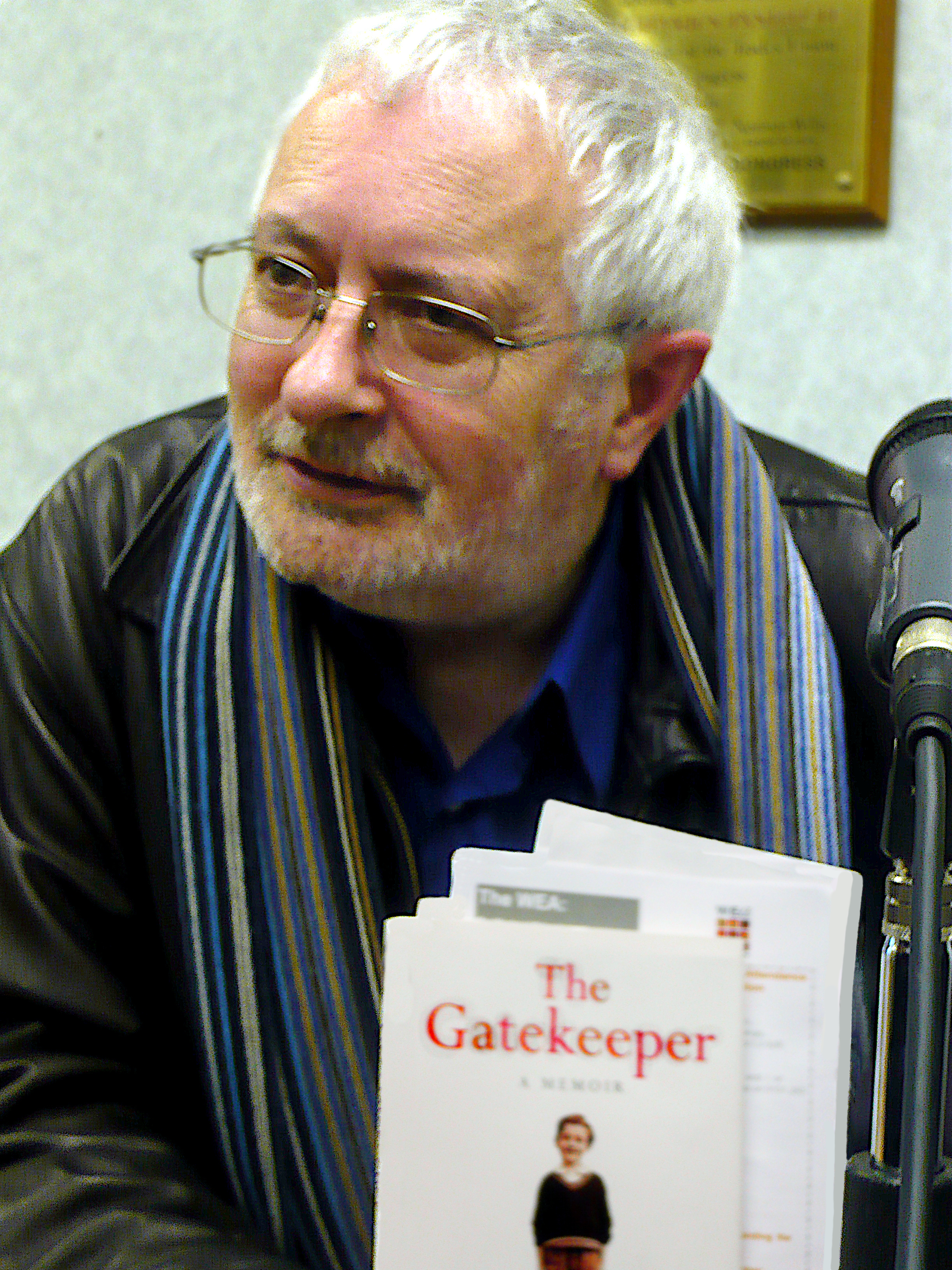
Terry Eagleton

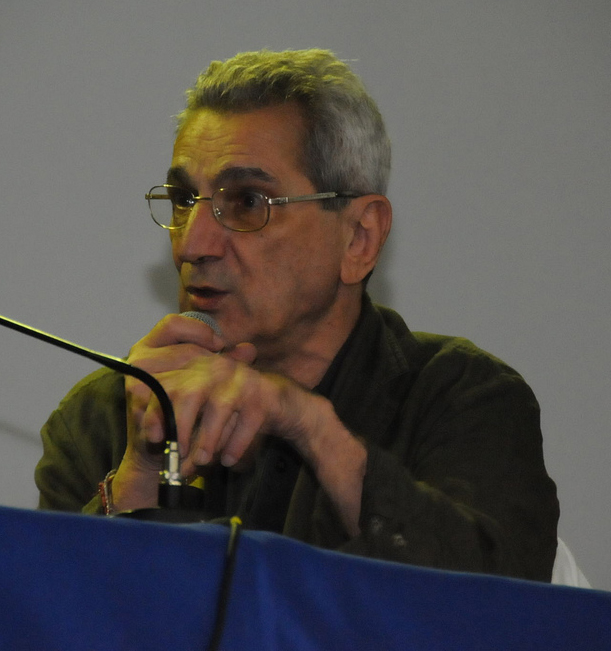
Antonio Negri

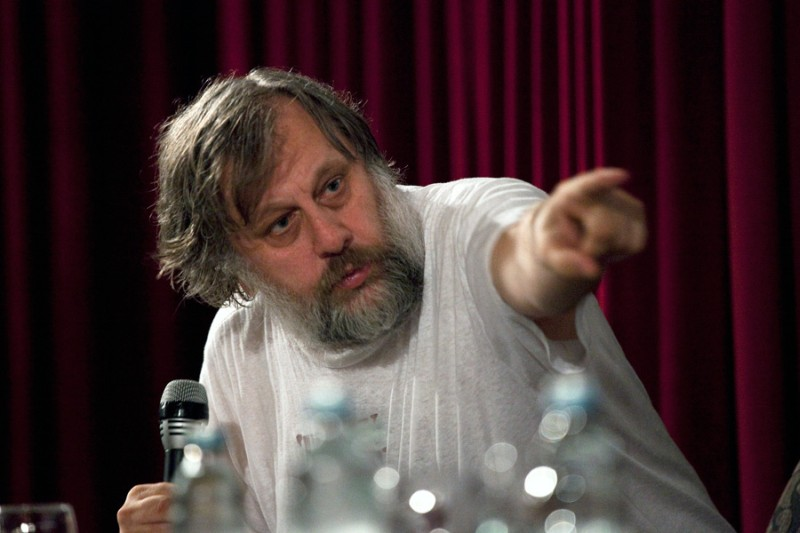
Slavoj Žižek

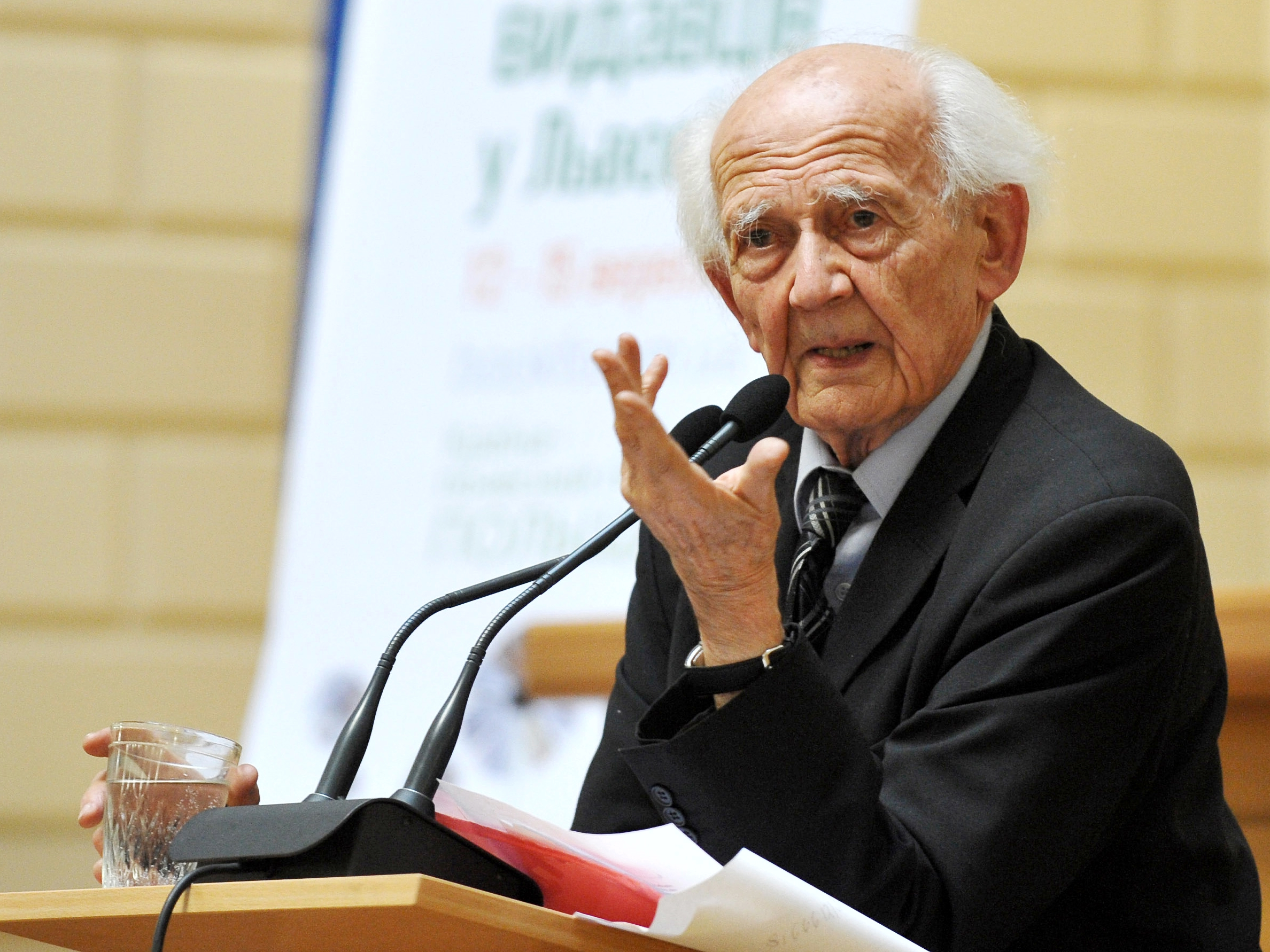
Zygmunt Bauman

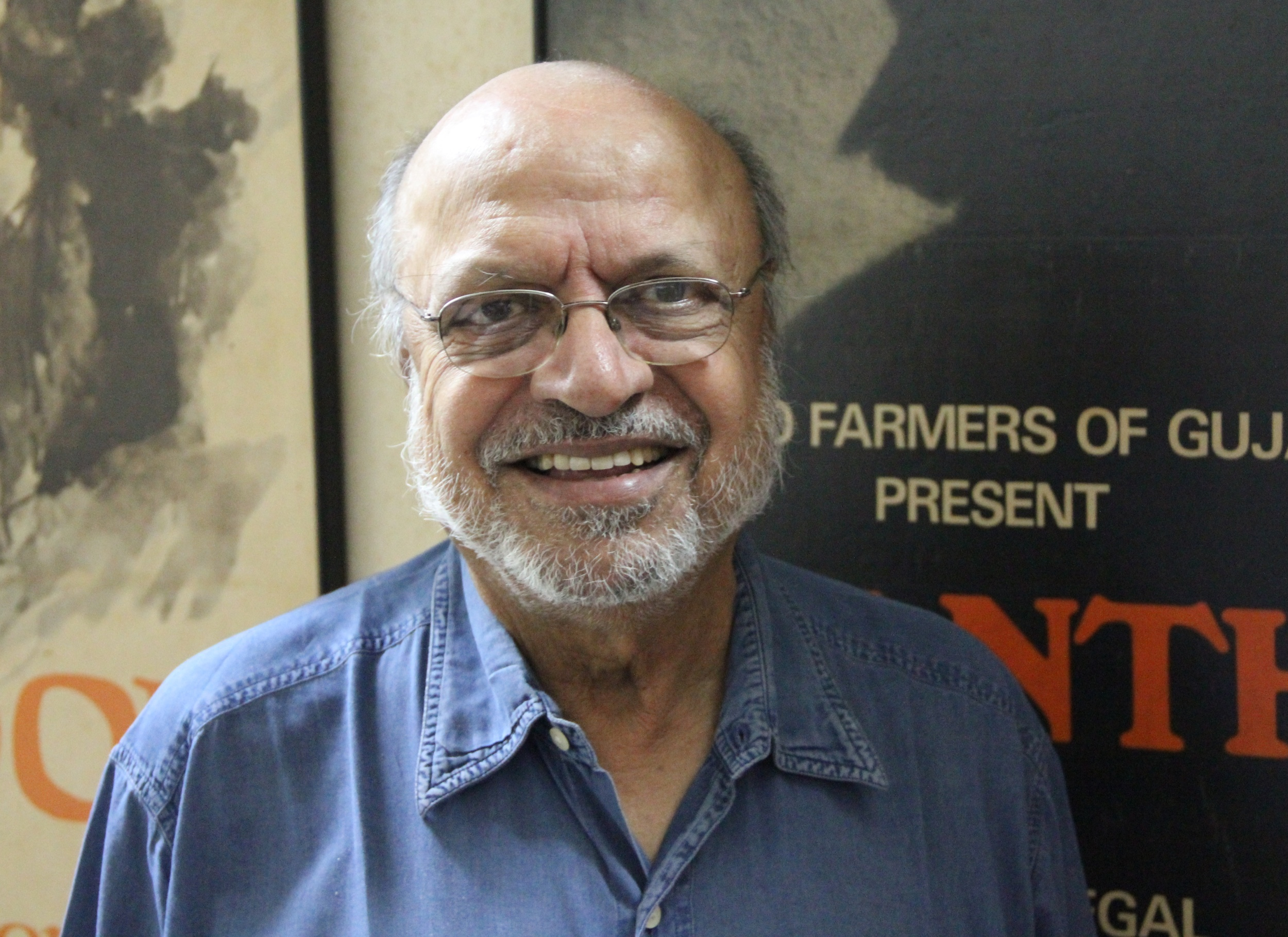
Shyam Benegal

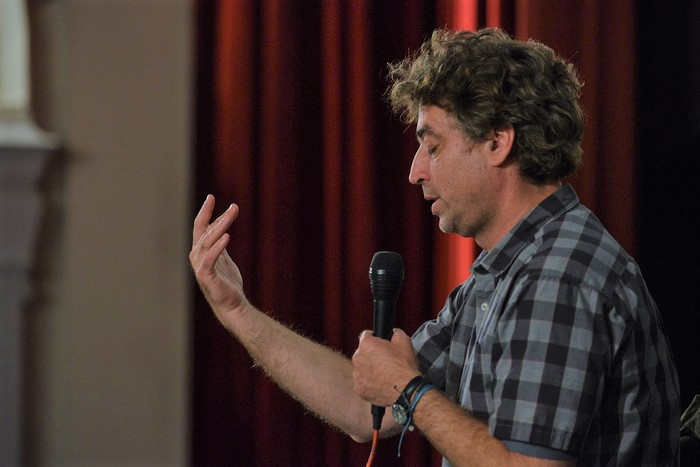
Michael Hardt

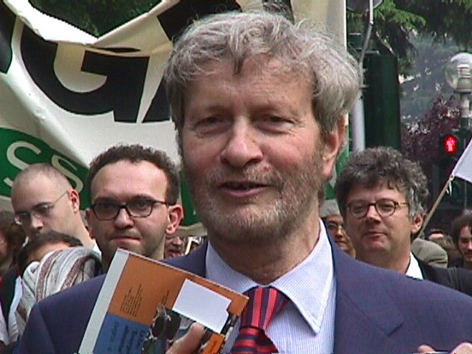
Gianni Vattimo

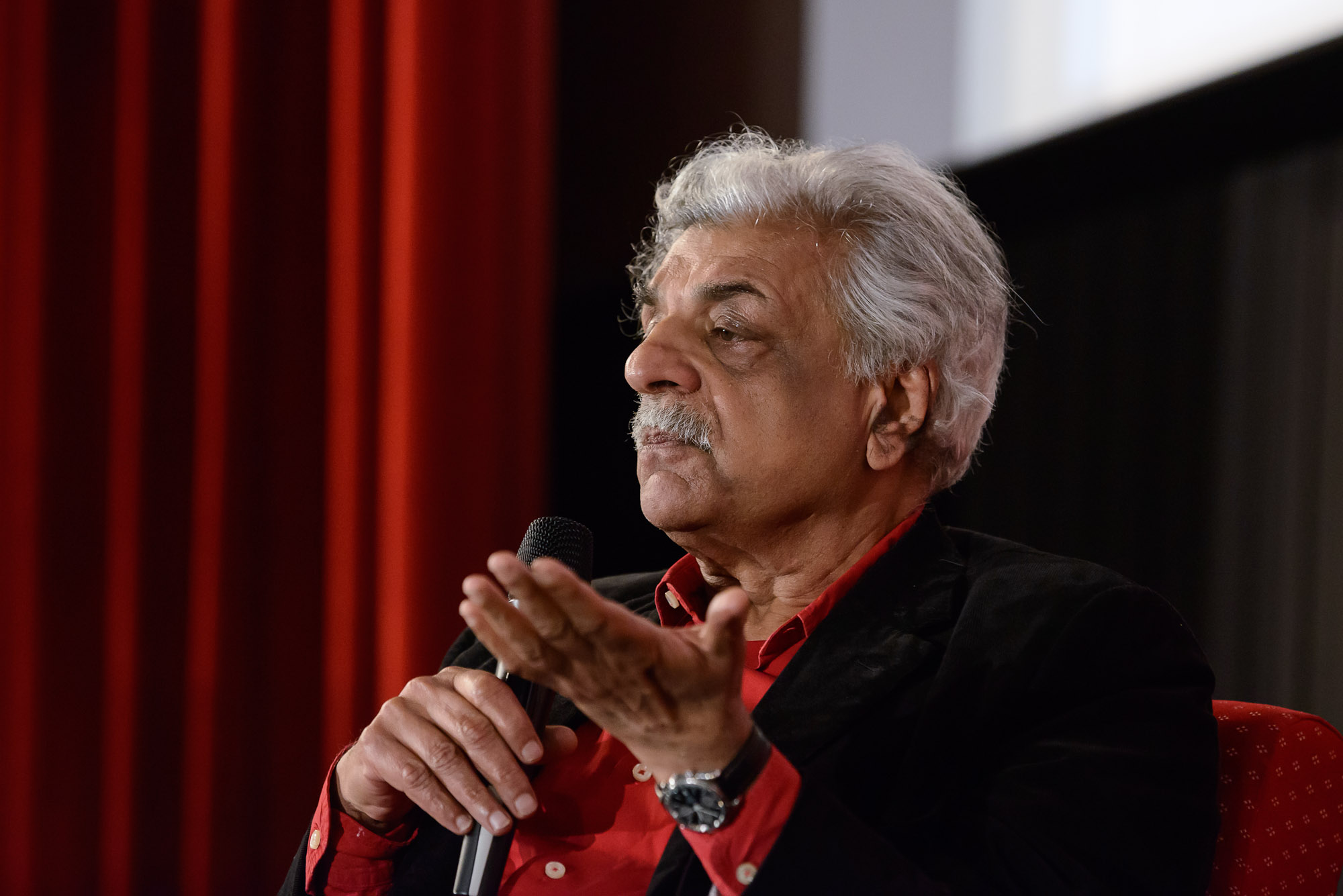
Tariq Ali

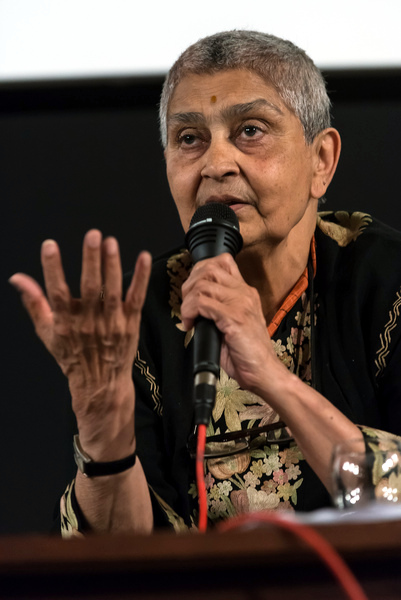
Gayatri Spivak

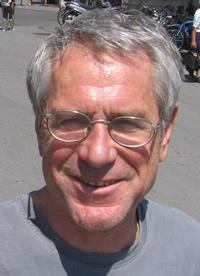
Želimir Žilnik

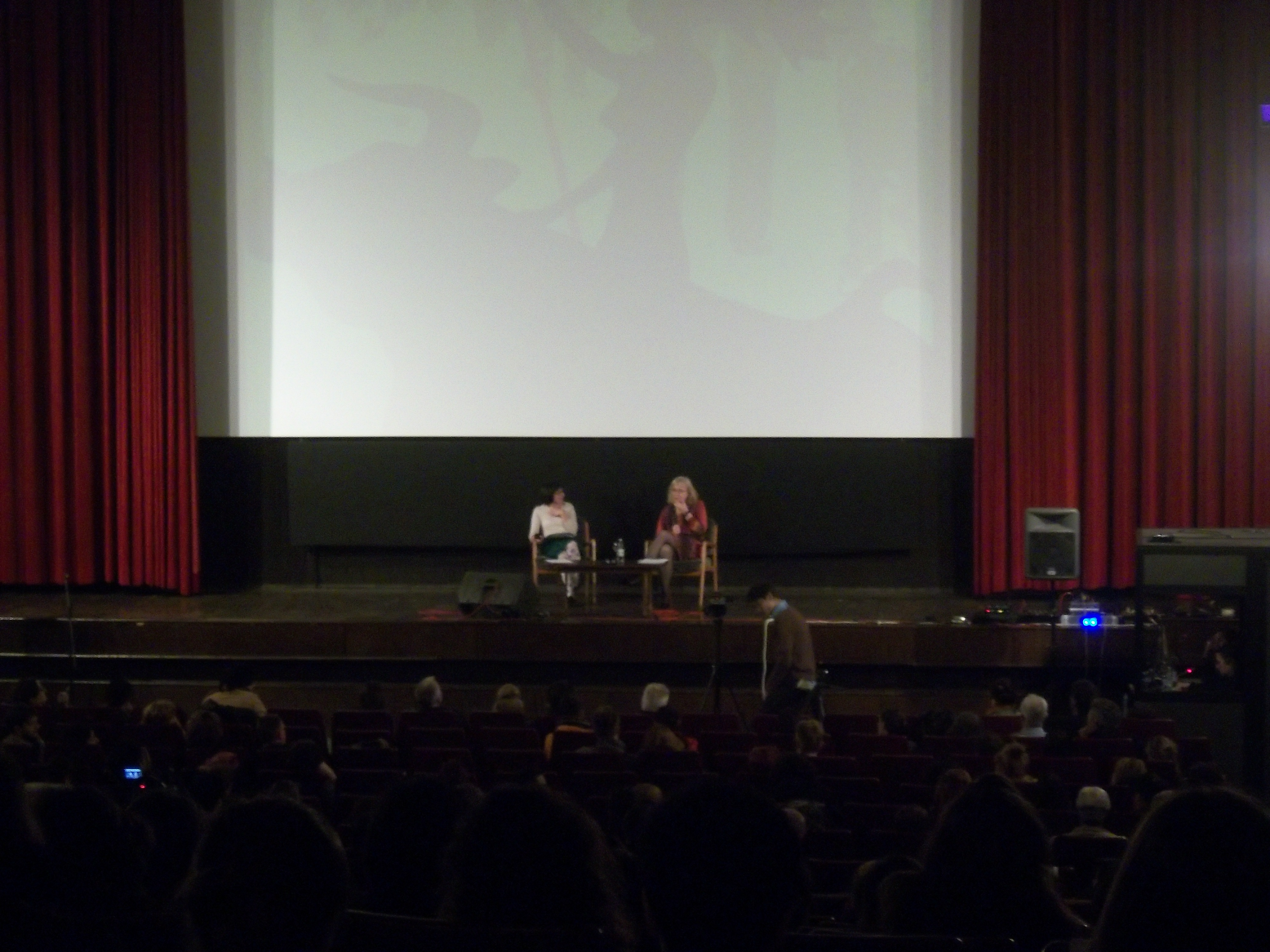
Renata Salecl

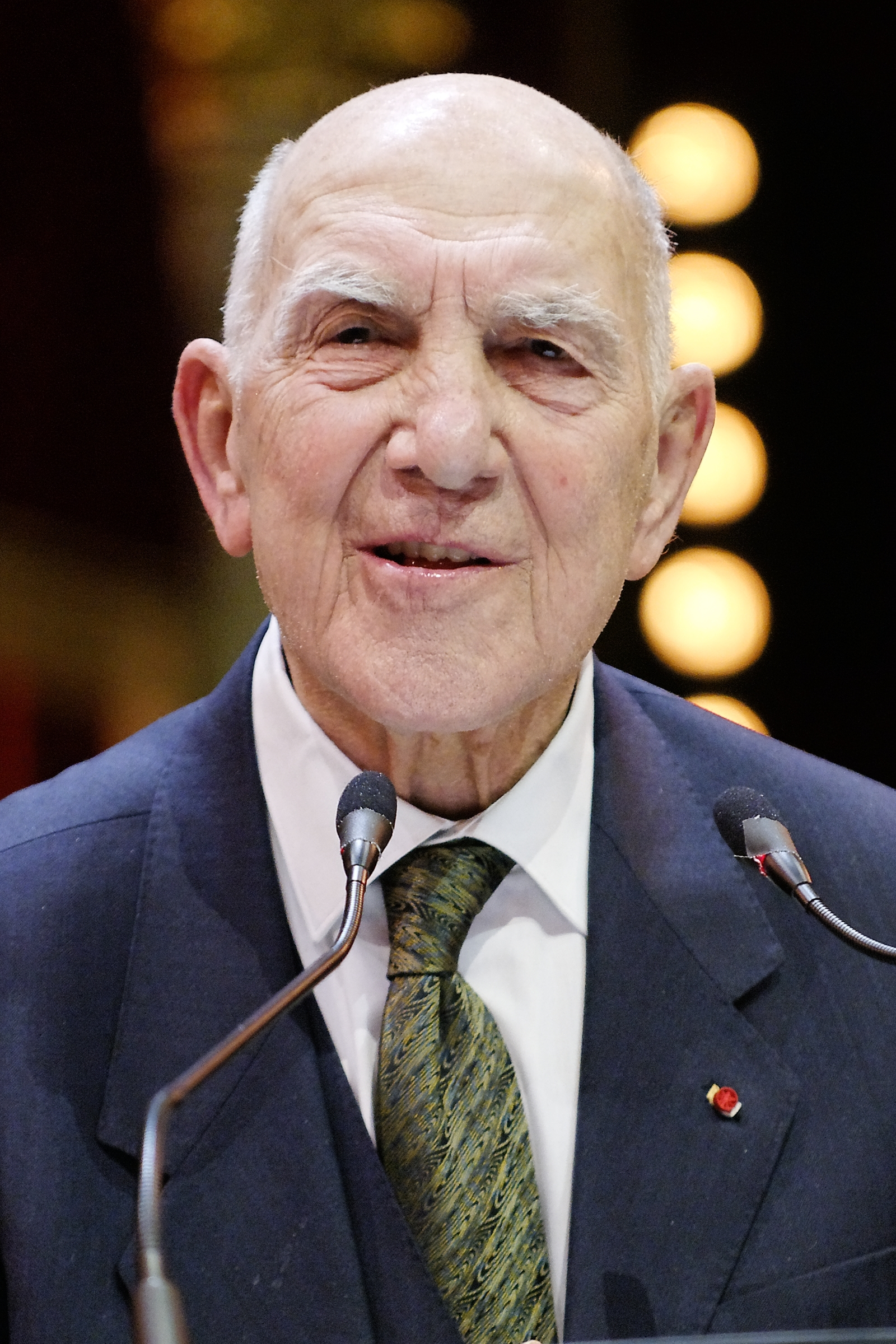
Stéphane Hessel

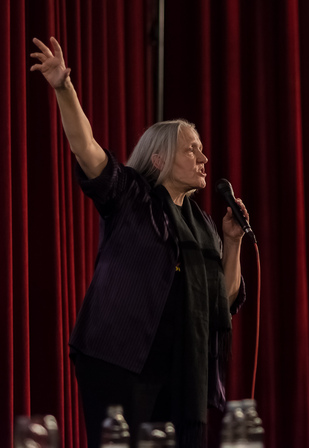
Saskia Sassen

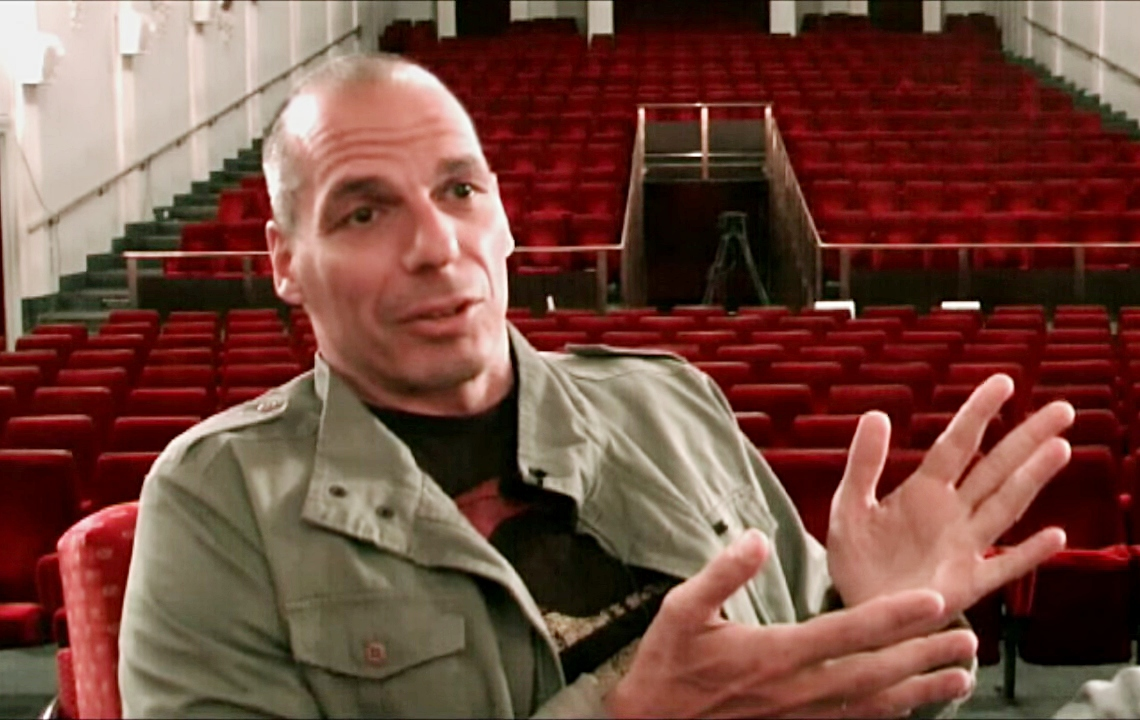
Yanis Varoufakis

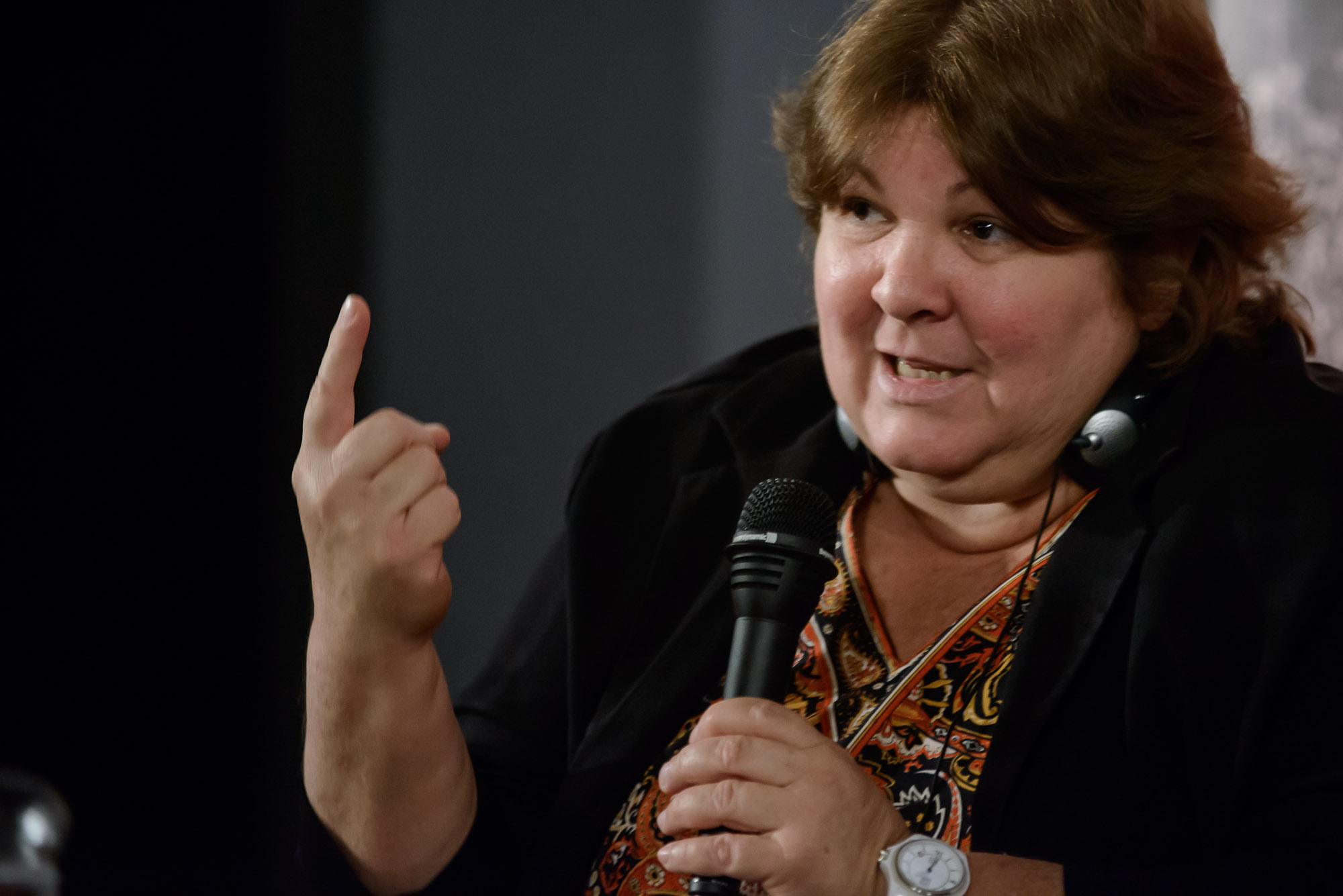
Aleida Guevara

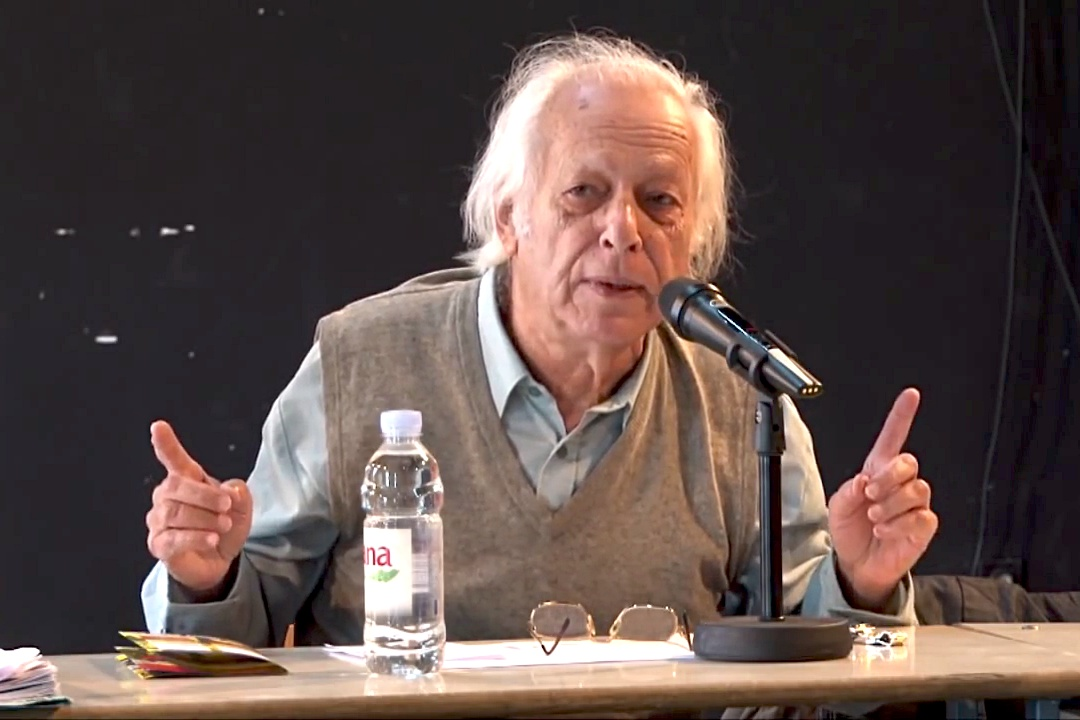
Samir Amin
