= Gerarda =

Gerarda can refer to:

- Gerarda (snake), a genus of water snakes named after a person named Gerard
- 1337 Gerarda, a main-belt asteroid named after Gerarda Prins, who calculated orbits at Leiden Observatory

A feminine given name, a Latinized female version of Gerard, used in the Netherlands. Most people use(d) short forms in daily life, like Gerda, Grada and Gré. People with this name include:

- Gerarda D. "Gré" Brouwenstijn (1915–1999), Dutch soprano
- Gerarda Victoria Downer, later Haya van Someren (1926–1980), Dutch politician, party chair of the VVD
- Gerarda Maria "Gerda" Kraan (born 1933), Dutch middle-distance runner
- Gerarda H.M. "Gerda" Lassooij (born 1952), Dutch swimmer
- Gerarda Alida Ridder-Visser (1914–2014), Dutch World War II resistance fighter
