= Jenny Sharpe =

Jenny Sharpe is a professor of English and Comparative Literature at UCLA (University of California, Los Angeles). Her research focuses on issues of postcolonial studies, Caribbean literature, theories of allegory, the novel, rethinking models of memory and the archive, and the effect of the Middle Passage. In 2020, she began serving as the Chair of Graduate Studies in UCLA's English Department.

In 2014, she became the Chair of Gender Studies, and is also Professor of English and Comparative Literature. From 2017-2018, she was the Stuart Hall Fellow at the W. E. B. Du Bois Research Institute at the Hutchins Center for African and African American Research at Harvard University. In 2020, she began serving as the Chair of Graduate Studies in UCLA's English Department.

== Early life and education ==
Sharpe was born in London, UK, and raised in Bombay, India. She a first generation-college graduate. Upon receiving her high school diploma, Sharpe became a flight attendant for Beirut-based Middle East Airlines, flying primarily throughout the Arab world. After coming to the United States, Sharpe settled in Princeton, New Jersey, where she worked in the stationery department at the local Woolworth's Department Store to save up enough money for college tuition, before enrolling at the University of Texas in Austin, in 1978.

After earning her BA, Sharpe was accepted to UT's PhD program in Comparative Literature where she met Gayatri Chakravorty Spivak, one of the founders of postcolonial and subaltern studies. Spivak became her dissertation chair, and supervised Sharpe's doctoral thesis.

Sharpe teaches courses on postcolonial theory, Caribbean literature, memory studies, and narrative theory at UCLA.

She lives in Los Angeles.

== Work ==
Sharpe is author of Allegories of Empire: The Figure of Woman in the Colonial Text (Minnesota 1993), which provides historically-grounded readings of Anglo-Indian fiction for how representations of interracial rape helped manage a crisis in British colonial authority. Her book has been widely reviewed and is considered a classic in postcolonial studies. Her second book, Ghosts of Slavery: A Literary Archeology of Black Women’s Lives (Minnesota 2002), challenges the equation of subaltern agency with resistance and self-determination, and introduces new ways to examine black women’s negotiations for power within the constraints of slavery.

Sharpe has published widely on gender, the Black Atlantic and cultural theories of postcoloniality and globalization in Gender and History, Signs, Atlantic Studies, PMLA, and Meridians, among other journals. Her latest book, “Immaterial Archives: An African Diaspora Poetics of Loss" was published by Northwestern University Press in 2020. The book identifies a philosophy of history and a theory of the archive from Caribbean literature and art.

== Publications ==
Her published works include the books Allegories of Empire, Ghosts of Slavery, essays, published interviews with Gayatri Spivak, and several edited volumes on postcolonial and Caribbean literature.

Select Publications

“What Use Is the Imagination?” PMLA 129: 3 (May 2014): 512-17.

“The Archive and Affective Memory in M. NourbeSe Philip’s Zong!” Interventions 16: 4 (Jul 2014): 465-82.

“When Spirits Talk: Reading Louisiana for Affect,” Small Axe 39 (November 2012): 90-102. “Figures of Colonial Resistance.” In Postcolonial Literary Studies: The First Thirty Years, ed. Robert P. Marzec (Johns Hopkins University Press, 2011).

“The Middle Passages of Black Migration.” Atlantic Studies 6: 1 (2009): 97-112.

“Plunder and Play: Éduoard Duval-Carrié’s Artistic Visions.” Callaloo 30: 2 (Summer 2007): 561-69.

“Sweetest Taboo: Studies of Caribbean Sexualities.” Review essay co-authored with Samantha Pinto, Signs 32: 1 (Autumn 2006): 247-74.

“Gender, Nation, and Globalization in Monsoon Wedding and Dilwale Dulhania Le Jayenge.” Meridians 6: 1 (2005): 58-81.

“Cartographies of Globalisation, Technologies of Gendered Subjectivities: The Dub Poetry of Jean ‘Binta’ Breeze.” Gender and History 15: 3 (2003): 439-58.

“A Conversation with Gayatri Chakravorty Spivak: Politics and the Imagination.” Signs 28: 2 (Winter 2003): 609-24.

Ghosts of Slavery: A Literary Archeology of Black Women’s Lives. Minneapolis: University of Minnesota Press, 2003. ISBN 978-0-8166-3723-2

“Postcolonial Studies in the House of US Multiculturalism.” Blackwell’s Companion to Postcolonial Studies, ed. Sangeeta Ray and Henry Schwarz (London: Blackwell, 1999): 112-25.

“‘The Limits of What Is Possible’: Reimagining sharam in Salman Rushdie’s Shame.” Jouvert 1: 1 (Fall 1997).

“‘Something Akin to Freedom’: The Case of Mary Prince.” differences 8: 1 (1996): 31-56.

“Is the United States Postcolonial? Transnationalism, Immigration, and Race.” Diaspora 4:2 (Fall 1995): 181-199.

Allegories of Empire: The Figure of Woman in the Colonial Text. Minneapolis: University of Minnesota Press, 1993. ISBN 978-0816620609

“The Violence of Light in the Land of Desire; or, How William Jones Discovered India.” boundary 2 20: 2 (Winter 1992): 26-46.
