= Attie =

Attie may refer to:

- Attie people (Attié)
  - Attie language

== People ==
- Alice Attie (born 1950), American artist
- Dotty Attie (born 1938), American artist
- Eli Attie, American politician, son of Dotty
- Raphaël Attie (born 1989), French volleyball player
- Shimon Attie (born 1957), American artist
- Vanille Attié, French actress
- Attie Howard (1871–1945), Canadian ice hockey player
- Attie Maposa (born 1990), South African cricketer
- Attie van Heerden (1898–1965), South African rugby player and athlete

== Other ==
- Attie Building, in Los Angeles, California
