= Li Minqi =

Chinese Marxist political economist (born 1969)

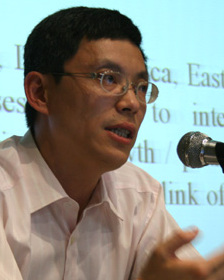
- Li Minqi speaking on Subversive Festival (2009)
- Born: 1969 (age 56–57)
- Education: Beijing University; University of Massachusetts Amherst
- Known for: Chinese New Left; World-systems approach
- Scientific career
- Fields: Political economy Marxism; World systems theory Chinese economy
- Workplaces: University of Massachusetts Amherst; York University; University of Utah

Li Minqi (born 1969) is a Chinese political economist, world-systems analyst, and historical social scientist, currently professor of economics at the University of Utah. Li is known as an advocate of the Chinese New Left and as a Marxian economist.

== Biography ==
Li was a student at the Economic Management Department of Beijing University during the period 1987–90. There he studied and became convinced of neoliberal 'Chicago School' economics. He engaged in many protests of the existing economic system, and engaged in much activism during and after the 1989 Democracy Movement.

Li was arrested after advocating free market principles in 1990, and made a vast switch to become a Marxist after extensive reading of the works of Karl Marx, Mao Zedong, and others while a political prisoner until his release in 1992. Li spent the next two years traveling in China, debating with remaining liberal dissident activists and conducting his own research into political, economic, and social development in modern China, using fake identification to visit provincial and city libraries. His view became one opposed to the mainstream, being that Mao Zedong's influence was a "revolutionary legacy rather than a historical burden for future socialist revolutionaries."

In 1994, he authored the book Capitalist Development and Class Struggle in China, which consisted of an analysis of the economic development of China in the Maoist era and the 1980s, as well as a Marxist analysis of the 1989 "democratic movement", arguing that it was not a popular democratic movement and was abandoned by the liberal intellectuals, led to the physical and ideological slaughter of the urban working class, and led to a victory of the bureaucratic capitalists. He attempted to show that this paved the way for China's transition to Capitalism. He criticized neoliberal economics and its relation to economic rationality, inherent contradictions between democracy and capitalism, and the social and material conditions that had led to China's rise with a conclusion focusing on a criticism of state-capitalism and advocating democratic socialism.

After firmly completing a political and intellectual break with the mainstream Chinese liberal tradition and their political counterparts, he established himself as a revolutionary Marxist. Li arrived in the United States on December 25, 1994, and became a graduate student at the University of Massachusetts Amherst [B.A. (summa cum laude) Economics University of Delaware (1996)]. Since then, he has been among the foremost promoters of the Chinese "New Left."

Li went on to author many Marxist articles for Monthly Review in this period, notably "After Neoliberalism: Empire, Social Democracy, or Socialism?".

In 2001 Li's focus shifted to World Capitalist Systems, and the work of Immanuel Wallerstein in particular. Inspired by Wallerstein's arguments, he wrote a Chinese article, "Reading Wallerstein's Capitalist World-Economy—And the China Question in the First Half of the 21st Century," being the first economist to link the "rise of China" to the demise of capitalism. The article gained popularity among the New Left in China without his knowledge, and was published in Currents of Thought: China's New Left and Its Influences which he found by surprise while browsing in a Chinese bookstore in Philadelphia. In late 2001 he expanded his study of China in relation to World-Systems in a critique of Jiang Zemin's theory of Chinese social strata (a refutation of Marxist social relations from a Chinese perspective, arguing that China is moving towards a "middle-class society"), in his "China's Class Structure from the World-System's Perspective." Li argued that China's economic rise would in fact greatly destabilize the capitalist world-economy in various ways and contribute to its final demise. Building upon his previous two papers, he wrote "The Rise of China and the Demise of the Capitalist World-Economy: Historical Possibilities of the 21st Century." He then incorporated these and several other papers into his book "The Rise of China and the Demise of the Capitalist World-Economy" in 2009, in which he argued, based upon an analysis of environmental data in relation to the Capitalist world economy, that the only way to avoid the inevitable collapse of civilization is to adopt a socialist world government by the middle of the 21st century.

From 2003 to 2006, he taught graduate and undergraduate courses on political economy at York University in Toronto, Ontario, Canada, and then went on to teach at the University of Utah, where he currently teaches.

He later worked on translation of Ernest Mandel's "Power and Money" into Chinese with Meng Jie, and was an analyst of Chinese issues in 2008 for The Real News.

== Selected works ==
- China and the Twenty-First Century Crisis. London: Pluto Press (October 2015)
- The Rise of China and the Demise of the Capitalist World-Economy. London: Pluto Press; New York: Monthly Review Press (November 2008 / January 2009).
- The Rise of China and the Demise of the Capitalist World Economy. NYU Press. March 2009. ISBN 978-1-58367-182-5.
- Three Essays on China's State Owned Enterprises: Towards An Alternative to Privatization. Hamburg: VDM Verlag (October 2008).
- 'Socialism, Capitalism, and Class Struggle: the Political Economy of Modern China,' Economic and Political Weekly, XLIII(52): 77–96, December 27, 2008 – January 2, 2009.
- 'Climate Change, Limits to Growth, and the Imperative for Socialism,' Monthly Review, 60:3 (July–August 2008), pp. 51–67.
- 'An Age of Transition: The United States, China, Peak Oil, and the Demise of Neoliberalism,' Monthly Review, 59:11 (April 2008), pp. 20–34.
- Minqi, Li; Chaohua, Wang; Dan, Wang (May–June 1999). "A Dialogue on the Future of China". New Left Review. I (235). New Left Review.
- 'Response to Lau's "China: Labour Reform and the Challenge Facing the Working Class",' Capital and Class, 65 (1998).

== See also ==
- Tiananmen Square protests of 1989
- Immanuel Wallerstein
- World-systems approach
- Chinese New Left
