= Gayatri Chakravorty Spivak =

Indian scholar and feminist critic (born 1942)

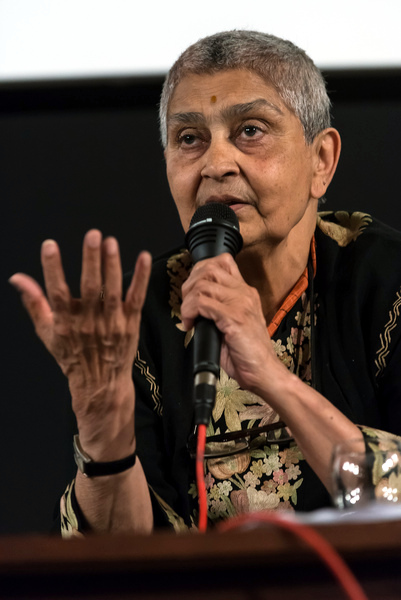
- Spivak in 2012
- Born: Gayatri Chakravorty; 24 February 1942 (age 84); Calcutta, Bengal Province, British India (now Kolkata, West Bengal, India)
- Spouses: Talbot Spivak (m. 1964–1977): Basudev Chatterji

Education
- Education: University of Calcutta (MA); Cornell University (PhD)
- Thesis: The Great Wheel: Stages in the Personality of Yeats's Lyric Speaker (1967)
- Doctoral advisor: Paul de Man

Philosophical work
- Era: Contemporary philosophy
- Region: Western philosophy
- School: Continental philosophy, postcolonialism, deconstruction
- Main interests: Literary criticism, feminism, Marxism, postcolonialism
- Notable ideas: Strategic essentialism, the Subaltern, the Other

Gayatri Chakravorty Spivak (/ˈspɪvæk/; born 24 February 1942) is an Indian literary theorist and feminist critic. She is a professor at Columbia University and a founding member of Columbia's Institute for Comparative Literature and Society.

Considered as one of the most influential postcolonial intellectuals, Spivak is best known for her essay "Can the Subaltern Speak?" and her translation of and introduction to Jacques Derrida's De la grammatologie. She has also translated many works of Mahasweta Devi into English with critical notes on Devi's life and writing style, notably Imaginary Maps and Breast Stories.

Spivak was awarded the 2012 Kyoto Prize in Arts and Philosophy for "speaking for the humanities against intellectual colonialism in relation to the globalized world." In 2013, she received the Padma Bhushan, the third-highest civilian award in India. In 2025, Spivak received the Holberg Prize for "her groundbreaking work in the fields of literary theory and philosophy."

Although often associated with postcolonialism, Spivak has stated her separation from the discipline in her book A Critique of Postcolonial Reason (1999), a position she maintained in a 2021 essay titled "How the Heritage of Postcolonial Studies Thinks Colonialism Today", published in Janus Unbound: Journal of Critical Studies.

== Life ==
=== Early life ===
Spivak was born on 24 February 1942 as Gayatri Chakravorty in Calcutta, India, into a Bengali Brahmin family. Her father was Pares Chandra Chakravorty, a doctor, and mother was Sivani Chakravorty, a charitable worker. Her great-great-grandfather was Biharilal Bhaduri, a physician advocating homeopathy and a close friend of the Bengali reformer Ishwar Chandra Vidyasagar. After completing her secondary education at St. John's Diocesan Girls' Higher Secondary School, Spivak attended Presidency College, Kolkata, from which she graduated in 1959.

Spivak has been married twice—first to Talbot Spivak (1937–2006), a fellow Cornell University student, from 1964 to 1977, and then until 1992 to historian Basudev Chatterji. Talbot Spivak published an autobiographical novel centred on their early marriage, The Bride Wore the Traditional Gold, in 1972.

=== 1960s and 1970s ===
In 1959, upon graduation from Presidency College, she secured full-time employment as an English tutor. In 1961, Spivak joined the graduate program in English at Cornell University in the United States, travelling on money borrowed on a so-called "life mortgage". Unable to secure financial aid from the department of English, she transferred to the new comparative literature program, although she had insufficient preparation in French and German. She completed her Master of Arts in 1962, studying under M. H. Abrams. In 1963–1964, she attended Girton College, Cambridge, as a research student under the supervision of T.R. Henn, writing on the representation of the stages of development of the lyric subject in the poetry of W. B. Yeats. She presented a course in the summer of 1963 on "Yeats and the Theme of Death" at the Yeats Summer School in Sligo, Ireland.

Spivak was appointed assistant professor at the University of Iowa in 1965. She co-founded the MFA in Translation in 1974 and became a full professor and director of the Comparative Literature Program a year later. While teaching at Iowa, she worked towards her PhD at Cornell. Her dissertation was under the guidance of the program's first director, Paul de Man, titled The Great Wheel: Stages in the Personality of Yeats's Lyric Speaker (1967); she later reworked it to be accessible for undergraduate students and published it as her first book, Myself Must I Remake: The Life and Poetry of W.B. Yeats (1974). While at Cornell, she served as the second female member of the Telluride Association. She taught at the University of Iowa until 1977.

In 1967, Spivak purchased De la grammatologie by Jacques Derrida, though she was unfamiliar with the author. She decided to translate the book, and wrote a translator's preface. This publication was a success, and the preface has since been used around the world as an introduction to the philosophy of deconstruction launched by Derrida, whom Spivak met in 1971.

In 1977–78, she was a National Humanities Fellow at the University of Chicago. Also in 1978, she joined the University of Texas at Austin as professor of English and comparative literature, teaching there until 1982.

=== 1980s to present ===
In 1982, she was appointed as the Longstreet Professor in English and Comparative Literature at Emory University. In 1986, at the University of Pittsburgh, she became the first Mellon Professor of English. At Pittsburgh, she was the first director of the Graduate Program for Cultural Studies. In 1991, she joined the faculty at Columbia University as Avalon Foundation Professor in the Humanities; in 2007, she was made University Professor in the Humanities at Columbia.

Since 1986, Spivak has been engaged in teaching adults and children among the landless illiterate Dalit people living in western West Bengal. In 1997, her friend Lore Metzger, a survivor of Nazi Germany, left Spivak $10,000 in her will to help with the work of rural education. With this, Spivak established the Pares Chandra and Sivani Chakravorty Memorial Foundation for Rural Education, to which she contributed the majority of her Kyoto Prize.

In May 2018, Spivak signed a collective letter to New York University defending Avital Ronell against the charge of sexual abuse from NYU graduate student Nimrod Reitman. Spivak and the other signatories called the case a "legal nightmare" for Ronell and charged Reitman with conducting a "malicious campaign" against her. The letter also suggested that Ronell should be excused on the basis of the significance of her academic contributions. Many signatories were also concerned of the utilisation of feminist tools, like Title IX, to take down feminists. Judith Butler, the chief signatory, subsequently apologised for certain aspects of the letter. NYU ultimately found Ronell guilty of sexual harassment and suspended her for a year.

In May 2024, Spivak repeatedly corrected the pronunciation of W. E. B. Du Bois' name by a Dalit graduate student, Anshul Kumar, who asked her a question as part of a discussion at an event in Jawaharlal Nehru University, New Delhi. Kumar shared in a blog post about feeling humiliated and insulted during the incident. Spivak remarked in an interview that Anshul Kumar "had not identified himself as a Dalit." Dalit scholar Anilkumar Payyappilly Vijayan called the student's reaction "a strategy of counter-violence" against "the structural violence built into the very edifice of postcoloniality on which many dominant class intellectuals [like Spivak] have been comfortably placed."

== Work ==
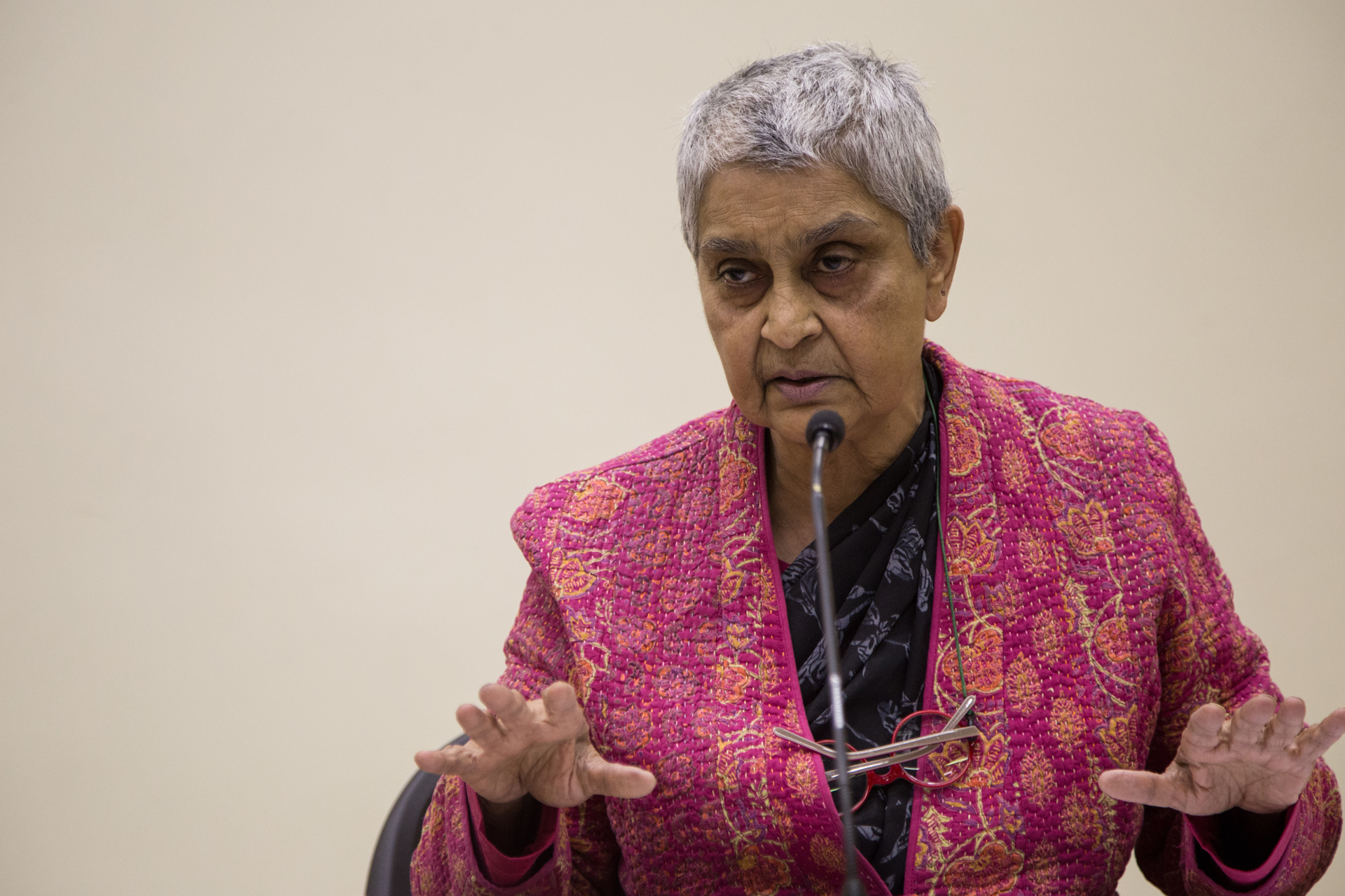
Spivak speaking on "The Strength of Critique: Trajectories of Marxism–Feminism" at the Internationaler Kongress

Spivak rose to prominence with her translation of Derrida's De la grammatologie, which included a translator's introduction that has been described as "setting a new standard for self-reflexivity in prefaces." After this, as a member of the Subaltern Studies collective, she carried out a series of historical studies and literary critiques of imperialism and international feminism. She has been referred to as a "practical Marxist-feminist-deconstructionist." Her predominant ethico-political concern has been for the space occupied by the subaltern, especially subaltern women, both in discursive practices and in Western cultural institutions. Edward Said wrote of Spivak's work: "She pioneered the study in literary theory of non-Western women and produced one of the earliest and most coherent accounts of that role available to us."

Spivak has been criticised for her cryptic prose. Writing for the New Statesman, Stephen Howe complains that "Spivak is so bewilderingly eclectic, so prone to juxtapose diverse notions without synthesis, that ascribing a coherent position to her on any question is extremely difficult." Terry Eagleton writes:

If colonial societies endure what Spivak calls 'a series of interruptions, a repeated tearing of time that cannot be sutured', much the same is true of her own overstuffed, excessively elliptical prose. She herself, unsurprisingly, reads the book's broken-backed structure in just this way, as an iconoclastic departure from 'accepted scholarly or critical practice'. But the ellipses, the heavy-handed jargon, the cavalier assumption that you know what she means, or that if you don't she doesn't much care, are as much the overcodings of an academic coterie as a smack in the face for conventional scholarship.

Judith Butler, in a response critical of Eagleton's position, cites Theodor W. Adorno's comment on the lesser value of the work of theorists who "recirculate received opinion," and opines that Spivak "gives us the political landscape of culture in its obscurity and proximity" and that Spivak's language has resonated with "tens of thousands of activists and scholars."

=== "Can the Subaltern Speak?" and postcolonial theory ===
Her essay, "Can the Subaltern Speak?" (1988), established Spivak among the ranks of feminists who consider history, geography, and class when thinking about women. In "Can the Subaltern Speak?", Spivak discusses the lack of accounts of the Hindu practice of sati (the burning of widows), leading her to reflect on whether the subaltern can even speak. Spivak writes about the focus on the Eurocentric subject and how by invoking the subject of Europe, intellectuals constitute the subaltern "other" of Europe as anonymous and mute. In all her work, Spivak's main effort has been to try to find ways of accessing the subjectivity of those who are being investigated. She feminises and globalises the philosophy of deconstruction, considering the position of the subaltern.

In the early 1980s, she was also hailed as a co-founder of postcolonial theory, which she refused to accept fully. Her A Critique of Postcolonial Reason, published in 1999, explores how major works of European metaphysics (e.g., Kant, Hegel) not only tend to exclude the subaltern from their discussions, but actively prevent non-Europeans from occupying positions as fully human subjects. In this work, Spivak launched the concept of "sanctioned ignorance" for the "reproducing and foreclosing of colonialist structures." This concept denotes a purposeful silencing through the "dismissing of a particular context as being irrelevant."

Spivak coined the term strategic essentialism, which refers to a temporary solidarity for the purpose of social action. For example, women's groups have many different agendas that potentially make it difficult for feminists to work together for common causes. Strategic essentialism allows for disparate groups to accept temporarily an essentialist position that enables them able to act cohesively and "can be powerfully displacing and disruptive." While others have built upon the idea of strategic essentialism, Spivak has been unhappy with the ways the concept has been taken up. In interviews, she has disavowed the term, although not completely the concept itself.

In speeches given and published since 2002, Spivak has addressed the issue of terrorism and suicide bombings. With the aim of bringing an end to suicide bombings, she has explored and "tried to imagine what message [such acts] might contain," ruminating that "suicidal resistance is a message inscribed in the body when no other means will get through."

In addition to Derrida, Spivak has also translated the fiction of the Bengali author Mahasweta Devi, the poetry of the 18-century Bengali poet Ramprasad Sen, and A Season in the Congo by Martinique writer Aimé Césaire. In 1997, she received a prize for translation into English from the Sahitya Akadami in India.

=== Academic roles and honours ===
She has been a Guggenheim Fellow. She was elected to the American Philosophical Society in 2007.

Spivak serves on the editorial board of Boundary 2 and Diaspora; on the advisory boards Janus Unbound, differences, and Signs; and as a consultant editor for Interventions.

Spivak has received honorary doctorates from the University of Toronto, University of London, Oberlin College, University of Rovira i Virgili, Rabindra Bharati University, Universidad Nacional de San Martín, University of St Andrews, Paris 8 University, Presidency University, Yale University, University of Ghana-Legon, and University of Chile.

In 2012, she received the Kyoto Prize in Arts and Philosophy, while in 2021 she was elected a Corresponding Fellow of the British Academy. In 2025, Spivak received the Holberg Prize.

Spivak has advised many significant post-colonial scholars. Jenny Sharpe and Mark Sanders are among her former students.

== In popular culture ==
Phire Esho, Chaka, a 1961 book of love poems by Binoy Majumdar, is dedicated to her.

Her name appears in the lyrics of the Le Tigre song "Hot Topic".

== Awards ==
- Guggenheim Fellowship in 1995
- Doctor of Letters from University of Toronto in 2000
- D.Litt. from University of London in 2003
- L.H.D. from Oberlin College in 2008
- D. Honoris Causa from University of Rovira i Virgili in 2011
- D. Honoris Causa from Rabindra Bharati University in 2012
- Kyoto Prize in Arts and Philosophy in 2012
- D. Honoris Causa from National University of General San Martín in 2013
- Padma Bhushan in 2013
- D.Litt from the University of St. Andrews in 2014
- D. Honoris Causa from Paris 8 University in 2014
- D.Hum from Yale University in 2015
- D.Litt from University of Ghana in 2015
- D. Honoris Causa from University of Chile in 2016
- Lifetime Scholarly Achievement Award from the Modern Language Association in 2018
- Holberg Prize in 2025

== Publications ==
=== Books ===
- Myself Must I Remake: The Life and Poetry of W.B. Yeats. Crowell. 1974. ISBN 9780690001143.
- In Other Worlds: Essays in Cultural Politics. Methuen. 1987. ISBN 9780415389563.
- Selected Subaltern Studies. Co-edited with Ranajit Guha. Oxford University Press. 1988. ISBN 9780195052893.
- The Post-Colonial Critic: Interviews, Strategies, Dialogues. Edited by Sarah Harasym. Routledge. 1990. ISBN 9781134710850.
- Outside in the Teaching Machine. Routledge. 1993. ISBN 9780415904896.
- The Spivak Reader. Edited by Donna Landry and Gerald M. MacLean. Routledge. 1995. ISBN 9781135217129.
- A Critique of Postcolonial Reason: Toward a History of the Vanishing Present. Harvard University Press. 1999. ISBN 978-0-674-17764-2.
- Death of a Discipline. Columbia University Press. 2003. ISBN 9780231503235.
- Conversations with Gayatri Chakravorty Spivak. With Swapan Chakravorty, Suzana Milevska, and Tani E. Barlow. Seagull Books. 2006. ISBN 9781905422289.
- Who Sings the Nation-State?: Language, Politics, Belonging. With Judith Butler. Seagull Books. 2007. ISBN 9781905422579.
- Other Asias. Wiley. 2008. ISBN 9781405102070.
- Nationalism and the Imagination. Seagull Books. 2010. ISBN 9780857423184.
- An Aesthetic Education in the Era of Globalization. Harvard University Press. 2012. ISBN 9780674051836.
- Harlem. Photographs by Alice Attie. Seagull Books. 2012. ISBN 9780857420848.
- Readings. Seagull Books. 2014. ISBN 9780857422088.

=== Articles and book chapters ===
- Spivak, Gayatri Chakravorty (1985). "Three Women's Texts and a Critique of Imperialism". Critical Inquiry. 12 (1): 243–261. doi:10.1086/448328.
- Spivak, Gayatri Chakravorty (1985). "The Rani of Sirmur: An Essay in Reading the Archives". History and Theory. 24 (3): 247–272. doi:10.2307/2505169. JSTOR 2505169.
- ."Speculations on Reading Marx: After Reading Derrida". Post-Structuralism and the Question of History. Derek Attridge, Geoff Bennington, Robert Young (eds.). Cambridge University Press. 1987.
- "Can the Subaltern Speak?". Marxism and the Interpretation of Culture. Cary Nelson and Lawrence Grossberg (eds.). Basingstoke: Macmillan. 1988.
- "Woman in Difference: Mahasweta Devi's 'Douloti the Bountiful'". Nationalisms and Sexuality. Andrew Parker, Mary Russo, Doris Sommer, Patricia Yaeger (eds.). Routledge: Routledge. 1992.
- Spivak, Gayatri Chakravorty (1994). "Responsibility". Boundary 2. 21 (3): 19–64. doi:10.2307/303600. JSTOR 303600.
- "Ghostwriting". Diacritics. 25 (2): 65–84. 1995. doi:10.7916/D85M6HBR.
- Spivak, Gayatri Chakravorty (January–February 1996). "'Woman' as theatre: United Nations Conference on Women, Beijing 1995". Radical Philosophy (75).
- Spivak, Gayatri Chakravorty (2001). "A Note on the New International". Parallax. 7 (3): 12–16. doi:10.1080/13534640110064084.
- Spivak, Gayatri Chakravorty (2006). "Scattered Speculations on the Subaltern and the Popular". Postcolonial Studies. 8 (4): 475–486. doi:10.1080/13688790500375132.

=== Translations with critical introductions ===
- Derrida, Jacques (2016) [1967]. Of Grammatology. The Johns Hopkins University Press. ISBN 9781421419954.
- Devi, Mahasweta (1995) [1993]. Imaginary Maps. Routledge. ISBN 9780415904636.
- Devi, Mahasweta (1997). Breast Stories. Seagull Books. ISBN 9788170461401.
- Mazumdar, Nirode; Sena, Rāmaprasāda (2000). Song for Kali: A Cycle. Seagull Books. ISBN 9788170461555.
- Devi, Mahasweta (2002) [1999]. Old Women. Seagull Books. ISBN 9788170461449.
- Devi, Mahasweta (2002) [1980]. Chotti Munda and His Arrow. Seagull Books. ISBN 9780857426772.
- Césaire, Aimé (2010) [1966]. A Season in the Congo. Seagull Books. ISBN 9781905422944.

== See also ==
- List of thinkers influenced by deconstruction
- Postcolonialism
- Postcolonial feminism
- Subaltern Studies
- Comparative literature
