= Basudev Chatterji =

Indian historian

Basudev Chatterji (1949 – 8 June 2017) was an Indian historian, writer and professor of history at the University of Delhi. He also held a position of Reader at the University of Hyderabad and a visiting professorship of history at the Indian Institute of Technology, Guwahati. He was the 20th chair person of the Indian Council of Historical Research from 20 May 2011 – 19 May 2014.

== Education ==
- Bachelor of Arts 1968, St Stephens College, Delhi
- Post-graduate studies, 1970, St Stephens College, Delhi
- PhD (History), 1978, University of Cambridge

== Career ==
He was a recipient of the commonwealth scholarship award for 1973–78. He attended the University of Cambridge from 1973 to 1978 and received his PhD in 1978 in history. He was one of 24 scholars who advised the University of Cambridge on strategic engagement with India as part of the Vice-Chancellor's Circle of Advisors.

He was a sitar player, having been trained by Pandit Uma Shankar Mishra, who was himself a disciple of Pandit Ravi Shankar.

He has published several books including "Towards Freedom: Documents on the Movement for Independence in India" and "Trade, Tariffs and Empire: Lancashire and British Policy in India, 1919–1939".
