= Alice Attie =

American visual artist and writer

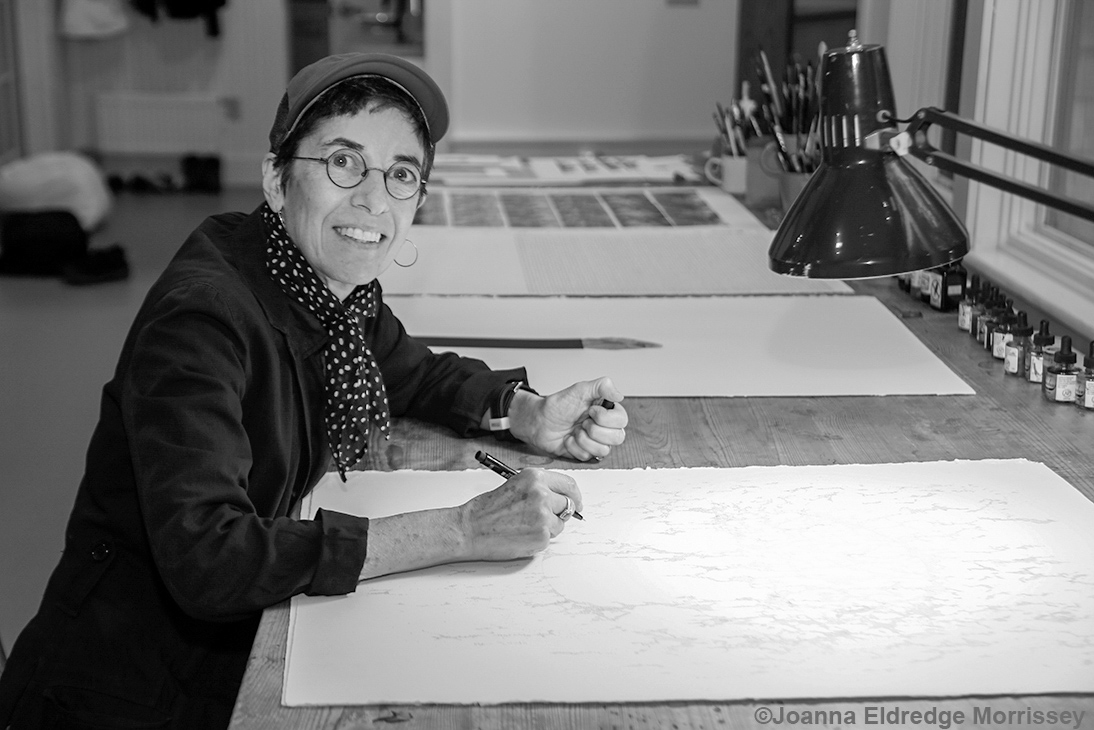
- Attie at work in her studio
- Born: July 27, 1950 (age 75); New York City
- Education: Barnard College (B.A.); City College of New York (MFA:Poetry); CUNY Graduate Center (Comparative Literature: Ph.D.)
- Occupations: Artist, writer
- Partner: Royce Howes
- Children: 2
- Website: aliceattie.com

Alice Attie (born in 1950) is an American visual artist and published poet from New York City.

== Education ==
After graduating from Barnard College in New York City with a degree in French literature, Attie obtained an MFA in poetry, studying under June Jordan at the City College of New York. Attie went on to complete a PhD from the Graduate Center of the City University of New York in comparative literature, with a doctoral dissertation focused on "modern elegy, specifically on the meeting place of language and the unspeakable: how we accommodate what is inaccessible to language".

== Photography and visual art ==
Attie's drawing practice began as an exploration of literary texts, as the expanded inscriptions which they inspired. Class Notes, ongoing, is a series of drawings composed during graduate philosophy and physics seminars at Columbia University. Attie's class notes are taken in the form of drawings.

Attie's drawing series Take Care of Yourself, inspired by the lectures of Michel Foucault at the College de France, are writing-drawing abstractions formed by repetitions of the phrase "Take Care of Yourself", referencing the Socratic notion of care as it was addressed in Foucault's studies.

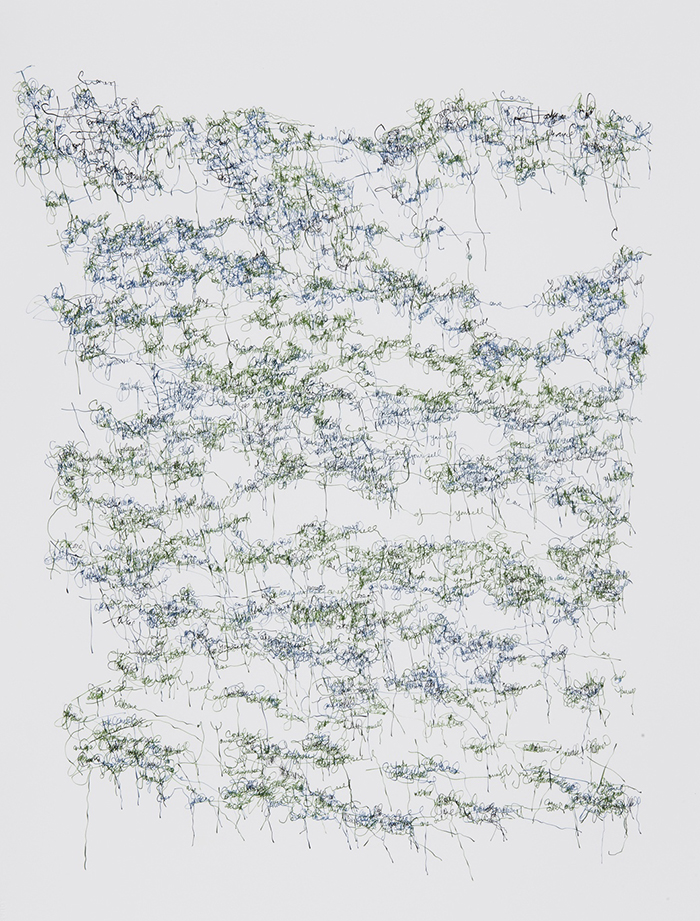
Michel Foucault – Take Care of Yourself

Attie's recent photographs feature the meadows, parks, and fields of Iceland, New Hampshire, upstate New York, and Central Park. Taken with her father's old 1937 Rolleiflex camera, her photographs explore the idea of nature as visual poetry.

Her photographic work and drawings on paper can be found in collections at The Whitney Museum of American Art, The Museum of Modern Art, The Studio Museum in Harlem, The Jewish Museum, The Getty Museum in Los Angeles and The Museum of Fine Arts in Houston, Texas.

In 2001, Attie published Alice Attie: Harlem on the Verge, (with introduction by historian Robin D. G. Kelley), a photography book of photo portraits and storefronts documenting modern-day Harlem on the verge of gentrification. In 2012, Attie collaborated with photographs in books by Gayatri Chakravorty Spivak: Harlem and An Aesthetic Education in the Age of Globalization. In 2012, Attie contributed photographs to Giorgio Agamben's book, The Church and the Kingdom.

Photographs of the artist June Leaf, taken over eighteen years, accompany images of June's drawings in the book Attie completed with Steidl Press to accompany the 2016 Whitney Museum Exhibition: June Leaf: Thought is Infinite.

== Poetry ==
Attie's first volume of poetry, These Figures Lining the Hills, was published by Seagull Books in November 2015. These Figures Lining the Hills was inspired by a request from Naveen Kishore of Seagull Books: a call to "write about notes, notes that we write to ourselves, in journals, in notebooks, perhaps notes that we imagine writing, fragments of notes, notes in margins, and notes, perhaps, that are not written". Having kept a journal for almost 50 years, Attie culled from her recent notebooks. Attie's poetry book Under the Aleppo Sun, 2018, with Seagull Books/University of Chicago Press, is a collection of poems were inspired by her visit to Aleppo, Syria, the home of her grandparents, in March 2011, as the war in Syria was taking hold.

== Influences ==
Attie studied under June Jordan while obtaining her MFA in poetry. She cites George Oppen, William Carlos Williams, and recently, Alice Oswald, as some of many poets who inspire her. She cites the works of the work of Franz Kafka as formative to her work in literature and art. Like Kafka, she sees her work as a mediation between two worlds, one which could be articulated and another which hovered, above or outside, but never in the field of definition.

== Exhibitions ==
- 2020 C19, Stones, Portraits of Ambiguity, Intensities, Abstractions, Galerie nächst St. Stephan Rosemarie Schwarzwälder
- 2018 Possibilities, Where are you? Galerie nächst St. Stephan Rosemarie Schwarzwälder
- 2017 Where am I? Galerie nächst St. Stephan Rosemarie Schwarzwälder
- 2016 Series Refugees, Silence Galerie nächst St. Stephan Rosemarie Schwarzwälder
- 2014 Green Weather Galerie nächst St. Stephan Rosemarie Schwarzwälder
- 2012 Physics Galerie nächst St. Stephan Rosemarie Schwarzwälder
