= Atie Ridder-Visser =

Gerarda Alida (Atie) Ridder-Visser
- Born: 23 July 1914
- Died: 20 August 2014 (aged 100)
- Occupation: Resistance fighter

Gerarda Alida (Atie) Ridder-Visser (23 July 1914 – 20 August 2014) was a Dutch resistance fighter during World War II. She was a member of the gang Marinus Post, she was known by the pseudonym Karin.

== Courier ==
She was recruited in the spring of 1944 by a woman from Woerden if she wanted to work as a courier. Following that experience, she ended up with the gang of Marinus Post as an experiment.

== Murder of Felix Guljé ==
After the war, Visser worked in Leiden at the Political Investigation Service (POD) with former gang chief Dick Spoor, who oversaw the group after the death of Post in 1944. Visser talked about a strategic bridge that was sabotaged by the resistance, but according to the Dutch Engineering Workshops (HCW), the bridge Felix Guljé would be repaired. It was decided to liquidate this Guljé. Yet When Visser looked at the file, Guljé was empty, despite the liquidation. On 1 March 1946 she called Visser at Guljé and told him she had a letter for him. When Guljé came to the front door, she shot him. She then returned to her rented room at Johan Knuttel. Although an investigation was opened into the murder, she was not a suspect. The commotion about the murder eluded Ridder-Visser because she read no newspapers.

== Aftermath ==
In 1947, Visser immigrated to the Dutch East Indies, where she met and married Herman Ridder. A few years later, the couple returned to the Netherlands and lived in Rotterdam and Hengelo. After spending several years in Spain, the pair again returned to Rotterdam.

On 5 May 1982, Ridder-Visser received the Resistance Cross from the Mayor of Leiden.

In 1999, a book she authored about Marinus Post was published under the title Marinus Mail alias Evert.

== Confession ==
In early 2011, Ridder-Visser wrote a letter to Mayor Lenferink of Leiden, where she confessed to murdering Guljé . On 18 March she had a conversation with Lenferink, who informed Guljé's family and the prosecution. Ridder-Visser was not prosecuted because the statute of limitations had expired on 2 March 1964.

On 6 May 2011 Ridder-Visser met two grandchildren of Felix Guljé.

On 8 June her story became public. Later she let them know that this was not her intention; her letter to Mayor Lenferink should not have been made public. They regarded the affair as something between her and family. During her first interview with Lenferink, he agreed that the contents of the letter would not be public. At a second meeting Lenferink, however, said that she was obliged to give it to him. A spokesman for the mayor said that at the first meeting it was not agreed that the letter should not be publicized.

She died on 20 August 2014, nearly a month after her 100th birthday.

== Bibliography ==
- Karin Evert Marinus Mail alias: war memories from 1944 (1999) ISBN 90-297-1633-9
- Paul van Beckum The courier of Marinus Post; Atie Ridder-Visser, a woman in a gang's Custom V (1999), no. 6, p. 30-35
- Jan G. Crum What moved you? Interviews with men and women in the Resistance (2007) ISBN 9789059115040

== Sources ==
- Mayor Lenferink on the murder ir. Felix Guljé in 1946 Historiek.net, June 8, 2011
- Resistance Woman: I'm a fighter, depers.nl, June 8, 2011
- Not even the law is adjusted on 1 January 2006, with crimes punishable by life imprisonment (including murder) no longer barred because it is not retroactive. (See also the principle of legality)
- Elderly murderess may keep cross resistance, withdraw impossible, the Volkskrant, June 9, 2011
- Former resistance fighter in the NRC: confession of murder in '46 was to remain private, NRC Handelsblad website, June 17, 2011
