= Nilkanth Babaji Ranade =

Indian lexicographer (1872–1918)

Nilkanth Babaji Ranade (1872–1918) was an Indian lexicographer and educator, best known for compiling The Twentieth Century English-Marathi Dictionary.

== Early life and education ==
Ranade completed his primary education at Wilson High School in Bombay. He subsequently attended Wilson College, where he earned a Bachelor of Arts (B.A.) degree.

== Career and lexicography ==
After completing his higher education, Ranade worked as a professor teaching English and history in Bhavnagar for a period of time.

Between 1903 and 1916, Ranade undertook the task of compiling The Twentieth Century English-Marathi Dictionary, which was published in 16 volumes. Prior to Ranade's work, Major Thomas Candy had created an English–Marathi dictionary between 1840 and 1847. Recognizing the structural changes in the Marathi language and the significant expansion of its vocabulary in the decades following Candy's work, Ranade set out to produce an updated lexicon.

To ensure accuracy, Ranade consulted scholars versed in Western scientific disciplines and engaged subject-matter experts to review specialized technical terminology. His contribution played an important role in enriching Marathi reference literature, earning his dictionary a prominent status among English–Marathi lexicons.

A new edition of Ranade's dictionary was published in 1977.
