= James Thomas Molesworth =

James Thomas Molesworth (1795 – 13 July 1871) was a military officer in the services of the British East India Company, and one of the most prominent lexicographers of the Marathi language.

== Early life ==
James was the youngest son of Richard and Catherine Molesworth, and nephew of William John, 6th Viscount Molesworth. James was educated at Exeter and arrived in India at the age of 16 after joining the East India Company as an ensign. His knowledge of the Marathi and Hindustani languages enabled him to serve as an interpreter for the 6th and the 9th Native Infantry regiments. He was promoted lieutenant in 1816, and subsequently transferred to the Commissariat department.

== The Dictionaries ==
In the year 1818, while Molesworth was stationed in Solapur along with his fellow interpreter Thomas Candy, the two started compiling a glossary of Marathi words. This led to the design of a comprehensive dictionary. After an initial lukewarm response to this proposal from the British Government, the work was formally begun in 1825, when (now Captain) Molesworth was stationed in Bombay. The work was simultaneously carried out for a Marathi-Marathi and a Marathi-English dictionary, (republished in 1970s by Sharad Gogate's Shubhada - Saraswat Prakashan) with the assistance of the twin brothers George and Thomas Candy, and a team of native Marathi-speaking Brahmins. A preface to the first edition of the Marathi-English dictionary describes the process as follows:

We employed Brahmans in several quarters of the Maratha territory to collect words, phrases and proverbs. We obtained, after all rejections under the heads of repetition, corruption, unsuitableness (from being too learned, too low, of too obvious signification, of too recent or too confined adoption, etc etc), above twenty-five thousand words…Of every word, in its order, [the Brahmans] investigated the grammatical designation, the derivation, the orthography, the gender, the meanings primitive and figurative, the applications regular and popular, the currency whether general or local… The points settled were written down instantly in Marathi and English; ... and all the materials were removed, and reserved for another hand. [In another department of our work], in a private and quiet room... [we] sat to cull out of books, and letters, and petitions, every useful word, every new meaning, every fresh idiom, every remarkable application, every requisite authority. In the most retired part of the house, [we] sat, with the most learned Brahman, to weigh, condense, arrange, and write off the materials prepared and delivered by the assembly. This was the third, the most important, and the most laborious department of our work...

The manuscripts were completed in 1828. The Marathi-Marathi dictionary (titled महाराष्ट्र भाषेचा कोश a.k.a. The Dictionary of the language of Maharashtra), containing approximately 25,000 words, was printed and distributed by the Bombay Native Education Society. A delay in the printing of the Marathi-English dictionary was used to advantage by Molesworth by augmenting it to 40,000 words. It appeared in 1831, under the title A Dictionary, Murathee & English, compiled for the Government of Bombay, by Captain James T. Molesworth.

== Later life ==
A bout of ill health prevented Molesworth from completing his next project, namely an English-Marathi dictionary, and he returned to England in 1836. As he came to believe that military service was incompatible with his calling as a Christian, he resigned from the Army and chose to forgo his pension. He was invited to India in 1851 to prepare a revised version of his Marathi-English dictionary. This work, containing 60,000 words, was published in 1857, and since then has been reprinted several times.

Molesworth's fluency in Marathi was much admired by his Indian colleagues, and his name was affectionately Indianised to 'Molesarshastri' or 'Moreshwarshastri'. ('Shastri' is a Sanskrit honorific derived from the word Shastra, loosely translatable as 'erudite'.)

He returned to England in 1860. Molesworth was a devout Christian and contributed much effort to evangelical causes and scriptural studies. He remained a lifelong bachelor. He died in Clifton on 13 July 1871.
