= Thomas Candy =

English educator

Major Thomas Candy
- A contemporary sketch of Major Thomas Candy (artist unknown)

Thomas Candy (13 December 1804 - 26 February 1877) was an English educator with a lifelong association to India, who made lasting contributions to the lexicography, orthography, and stylistics of the Marathi language.

Thomas Candy (together with his twin brother George) was born in England on 13 December 1804. After being educated in Indian languages at the Magdalene College in Oxford University, both were appointed Quartermasters in the armies of the British East India Company. They arrived in India in 1822, and primarily served as translators in several Infantry Regiments of the Company. During the 1830s, the brothers lent valuable assistance to Captain James Thomas Molesworth in the compilation of the English-Marathi dictionary. Although this project suffered a delay due to Molesworth's return to England in 1836 due to ill health, it was pushed to completion by Thomas during the years 1840-1847.

George had left the army in 1838 and become a Christian Missionary. He is the author of an early Christian pamphlet in Marathi, titled 'ख्रिस्ती धर्म कसा उत्पन्न झाला आणि कसा पृथ्वीवर वाढला (The Origin and Growth of Christianity on Earth, 1832)'. George subsequently returned to England in 1854.

After the completion of the English-Marathi dictionary, Thomas (who remained in India until his death) devoted his energies to the creation of Marathi textbooks in sundry school subjects, as well as Marathi translations of several English treatises, such as the Indian Penal Code and the Indian Civil Procedure Code. He also advised and corrected the work of several other English-Marathi translators. During the late 1860s, he was appointed Chief Government Translator by the British Government.

Thomas newly introduced the use of punctuation marks in Marathi, which was written without them until the mid-nineteenth century. His manual on this subject, titled 'विरामचिन्हांची परिभाषा (The Terminology of Punctuation Marks)' proved influential in the widespread dissemination of this practice. Thomas Candy's works have had a substantial cumulative effect on the style of non-fiction Marathi writing prevalent in the late nineteenth-century.

Throughout his life, Thomas served in several capacities as an educator, notably as Superintendent of Poona Sanskrit College, Superintendent of Schools in the southern region, and Principal of the Deccan College. He died in the town of Mahabaleshwar, in Maharashtra, India on 26 February 1877.
