= Marathi people =

Indo-Aryan ethnolinguistic group of India

- Flag of the Maratha Empire

Total population
- c. 83 million

Regions with significant populations
- India: 82,801,140 (2011)
- United States: 127,630
- Israel: 60,000 (Bene Israel)
- Mauritius: 25,200
- Australia: 13,055
- Canada: 9,755
- Pakistan: 500

Languages
- Marathi

Religion
- Majority: Hinduism; Minority: Islam Buddhism; Christianity; Jainism; Judaism

Related ethnic groups
- Other Indo-Aryan peoples

The Marathi people (/məˈrɑːti/) or Marathis are an Indo-Aryan ethnolinguistic group who are native to Maharashtra in western India. They natively speak Marathi, an Indo-Aryan language. Maharashtra was formed as a Marathi-speaking state of India on 1 May 1960, as part of a nationwide linguistic reorganisation of the Indian states. The term "Maratha" is generally used by historians to refer to all Marathi-speaking peoples, irrespective of their caste; However, it may refer to a Maharashtrian caste known as the Maratha which also includes farmer sub castes like the Kunbis.

The Marathi community came into political prominence in the 17th century, when the Maratha Empire was established by Shivaji in 1674.

== Etymology ==
According to R. G. Bhandarkar, the term Maratha is derived from Rattas, a tribe which held political supremacy in the Deccan from the remotest time. The Rattas called themselves Maha Rattas or Great Rattas, and thus the country in which they lived came to be called Maharashtra, the Sanskrit of which is Maha-rashtra. In the Harivamsa, the Yadava kingdom called Anaratta is described as mostly inhabited by the Abhiras (Abhira-praya-manusyam). The Anartta kingdom and its inhabitants were called Surastra and the Saurastras, probably after the Rattas (Rastras) akin to the Rastrikas of Asoka's rock Edicts, now known as Maharashtra and the Marathas.

== History ==
=== Ancient to medieval period ===
During the ancient period, around 230 BC, Maharashtra came under the rule of the Satavahana dynasty, which ruled the region for 400 years. The Vakataka dynasty then ruled Maharashtra from the 3rd century to the 5th century AD, and the Chalukya dynasty from the 6th century to the 8th century. The two prominent rulers were Pulakeshin II, who defeated the Kannauj Emperor Harsh, and Vikramaditya II, who defeated Arab invaders (Umayyad Caliphate) in the 8th century. The Rashtrakuta dynasty ruled Maharashtra from the 8th to the 10th century. The Persian merchant and traveller, Sulaiman al-Tajir, who wrote of his many voyages to India and China in the mid-9th century CE, called the ruler of the Rashtrakuta dynasty, Amoghavarsha, "one of the four great kings of the world".

From the early 11th century to the 12th century, the Deccan Plateau was dominated by the Western Chalukya Empire and the Chola dynasty.

The Yadava dynasty of Deogiri, ruled Maharashtra from the 13th century to the 14th century. The Yadavas were defeated by the Khaljis in 1321. After the defeat of Yadavas, the area was ruled for the next 300 years by a succession of Muslim rulers including (in chronological order): the Khaljis, the Tughlaqs, and the Bahmani Sultanate and its successor states called the Deccan sultanates, such as Adilshahi, Nizamshahi, and the Mughal Empire.

The early period of Islamic rule saw the imposition of a Jaziya tax on non-Muslims, temple destruction and forcible conversions. However, the mainly Hindu population and their Islamic rulers came to an accommodation over time. For most of this period Brahmins were in charge of accounts, whereas revenue collection was in the hands of Marathas who held watans (hereditary rights) of Patilki (revenue collection at village level), and Deshmukhi (revenue collection over a larger area). A number of families such as Bhosale, Shirke, Ghorpade, Jadhav, More, Mahadik, Ghatge, Gharge and Nimbalkar loyally served different sultans at different periods of time. All watandar considered their watan a source of economic power and pride and were reluctant to part with it. The watandars were the first to oppose Shivaji because it hurt their economic interests. Since most of the population was Hindu and spoke Marathi, even the sultans such as Ibrahim Adil Shah I adopted Marathi as the court language for administration and record-keeping.

Islamic rule also led to Persian vocabulary entering the Marathi language. Per Kulkarni, for the elites of the era using Persian words was a status symbol. Surnames derived from service during that period such as Fadnis, Chitnis, Mirasdar, etc. are still in use today.

Most of the Marathi Bhakti poet saints, who worshipped Vitthal, belonged to the period between late Yadava and the late Islamic era. These include Dnyaneshwar, Namdev, Eknath, Bahinabai and Tukaram. Other important religious figures of this era were Narsimha Saraswati, and Mahanubhava sect founder Chakradhar Swami. Shaivite saints like Manmath swami, and Sant Narahari Sonar. All of them used the Marathi language rather than Sanskrit for their devotional and philosophical compositions.

The decline of Islamic rule in Deccan started when Shivaji (1630–1680) founded the Maratha Kingdom by annexing a portion of the Bijapur Sultanate. Shivaji later led rebellions against Mughal rule, thus becoming a symbol of Hindu resistance and self-rule. The Marathas contributed greatly to weakening imperial Mughal rule and went on to rule over a large realm stretching from Gwalior to Cuttack.

=== Early modern period (1650–1818) ===
==== Political history ====
In the mid-17th century, Shivaji founded the Maratha Kingdom by conquering the Desh and the Konkan regions from Bijapur kingdom, and established Hindavi Swaraj ("self-rule of Hindu people"). The Marathas are credited to a large extent with weakening Mughal rule in India. After Shivaji's death, the Mughals invaded the Deccan in 1681. Shivaji's son Sambhaji, also his successor as Chhatrapati, led the Marathas against the much stronger Mughal opponent, but in 1689, after being betrayed, Sambhaji was captured, tortured and killed by the Mughal emperor Aurangzeb. The war against the Mughals was then led by Sambhaji's younger brother and successor Rajaram I. Upon Rajaram's death in 1700, his widow Tarabai became the regent of her infant son and took command of Maratha forces. In 1707, upon the death of Aurangzeb, the Deccan wars came to an end after Shahu, son of Sambhaji who had grown up under Mughal captivity was released, and quickly reclaimed the Maratha throne. Shahu and Tarabai briefly fought a succession battle with Shahu eventually prevailing. Shahu formally recognised Mughal suzerainty in return for tax collection rights over six Deccan provinces, and the release of his mother from Mughal captivity.

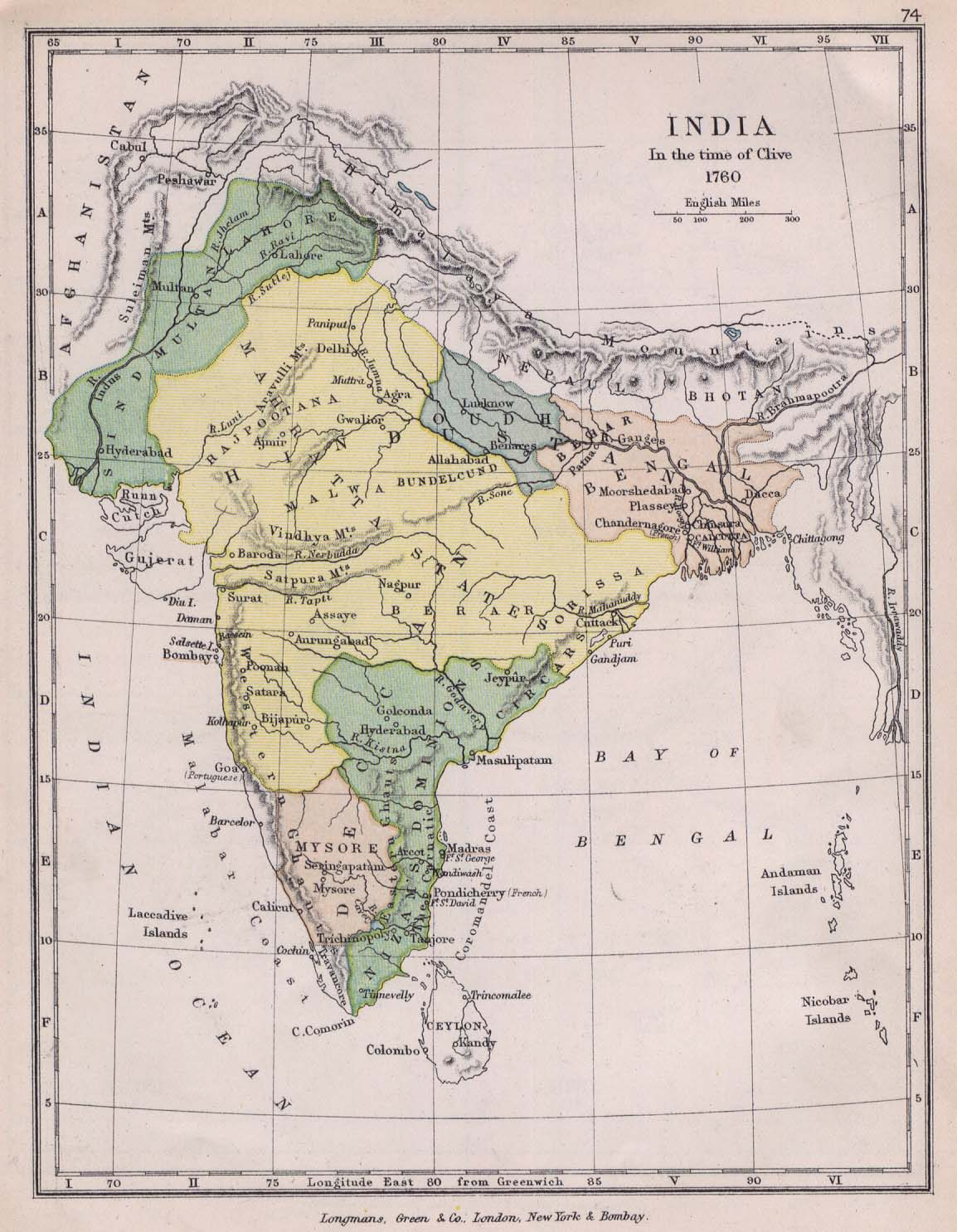
Territory under Maratha control in 1760 (yellow), with its vassals

Shahu I, the grandson of Shivaji, with the help of capable Maratha administrators and generals such as the Peshwa Balaji Vishwanath and his descendants, saw the greatest expansion of the Maratha power. After Shahu's death in 1749, the Peshwa Nanasaheb and his successors became the virtual rulers of the Maratha Confederacy. The Maratha Confederacy was expanded by many Marathi chieftains including Peshwa Bajirao Ballal I and his descendants, the Shindes, Gaekwad, Pawar, Bhonsale of Nagpur, and the Holkars. The Confederacy at its peak stretched from northern Karnataka in the south to Peshawar (modern-day Khyber Pakhtunkhwa) briefly during the Maratha–Afghan War in the north, and to Orissa in the east. However, after the Third Battle of Panipat in 1761, in which the Marathas were defeated by the Afghans under Ahmed Shah Abdali, the Maratha power was greatly diminished. Due to the efforts of Mahadji Shinde, it remained a confederacy until the British East India Company defeated Peshwa Bajirao II. Nevertheless, several Maratha states remained as vassals of the British until 1947 when they acceded to the Dominion of India.

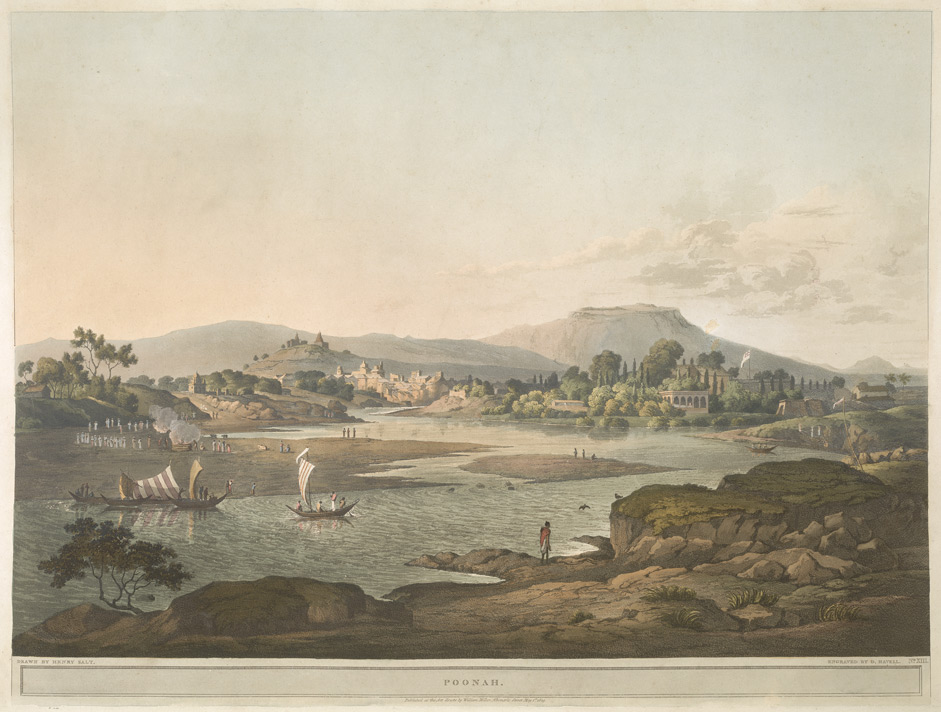
A watercolor painting of Pune from the late Peshwa era as seen from the confluence of the Mula and Mutha rivers, by British artist Henry Salt. The picture clearly shows the permanent features of the place and cremations. River confluences have been popular in Hinduism for cremations and also for ceremonial disposal of ashes

The Marathas also developed a potent coastal navy around the 1660s. At its peak under Maratha Koli Admiral Kanhoji Angre, the naval force dominated the territorial waters of the western coast of India from Mumbai to Sawantwadi. It would engage in attacking British, Portuguese, Dutch, and Siddi naval ships and kept a check on their naval ambitions. The Maratha Navy dominated until around the 1730s, but was in a state of decline by the 1770s, and ceased to exist entirely by 1818.

=== Social history ===
Before British rule, the Maharashtra region was divided into many revenue divisions. The medieval equivalent of a county or district was the pargana. The chief of the pargana was called Deshmukh and record keepers were called Deshpande. The lowest administrative unit was the village. Village society in Marathi areas included the Patil or the head of the village, collector of revenue, and Kulkarni, the village record-keeper. These were hereditary positions. The Patil usually came from the Maratha caste. The Kulkarni were usually from the Marathi Brahmin or CKP caste. The village also used to have twelve hereditary servants called the Balutedar. The Balutedar system was supportive of the agriculture sector. Servants under this system provided services to the farmers and the economic system of the village. The base of this system was caste. The servants were responsible for tasks specific to their castes. There were twelve kinds of servants under Bara Balutedar: Joshi (village priest and astrologer from Brahmin caste), Sonar (goldsmith from Daivadnya caste), Sutar (carpenter), Gurav (priest of Shiva temple), Nhawi (barber), Parit (washerman), Teli (oil pressers), Kumbhar (potter), Chambhar (cobbler), Dhor, Koli (fisherman or water carrier), Chougula (assistant to Patil), Mang (rope maker), and Mahar (village security). In this list of Balutedar: Dhor, Mang, Mahar, and Chambhar belonged to the untouchable group of castes.

In exchange for their services, the Balutedars were granted complex sets of hereditary rights (watan) to a share in the village harvest.

=== British colonial rule ===
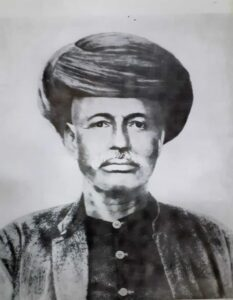
Mahatma Jyotirao Phule, Social reformer

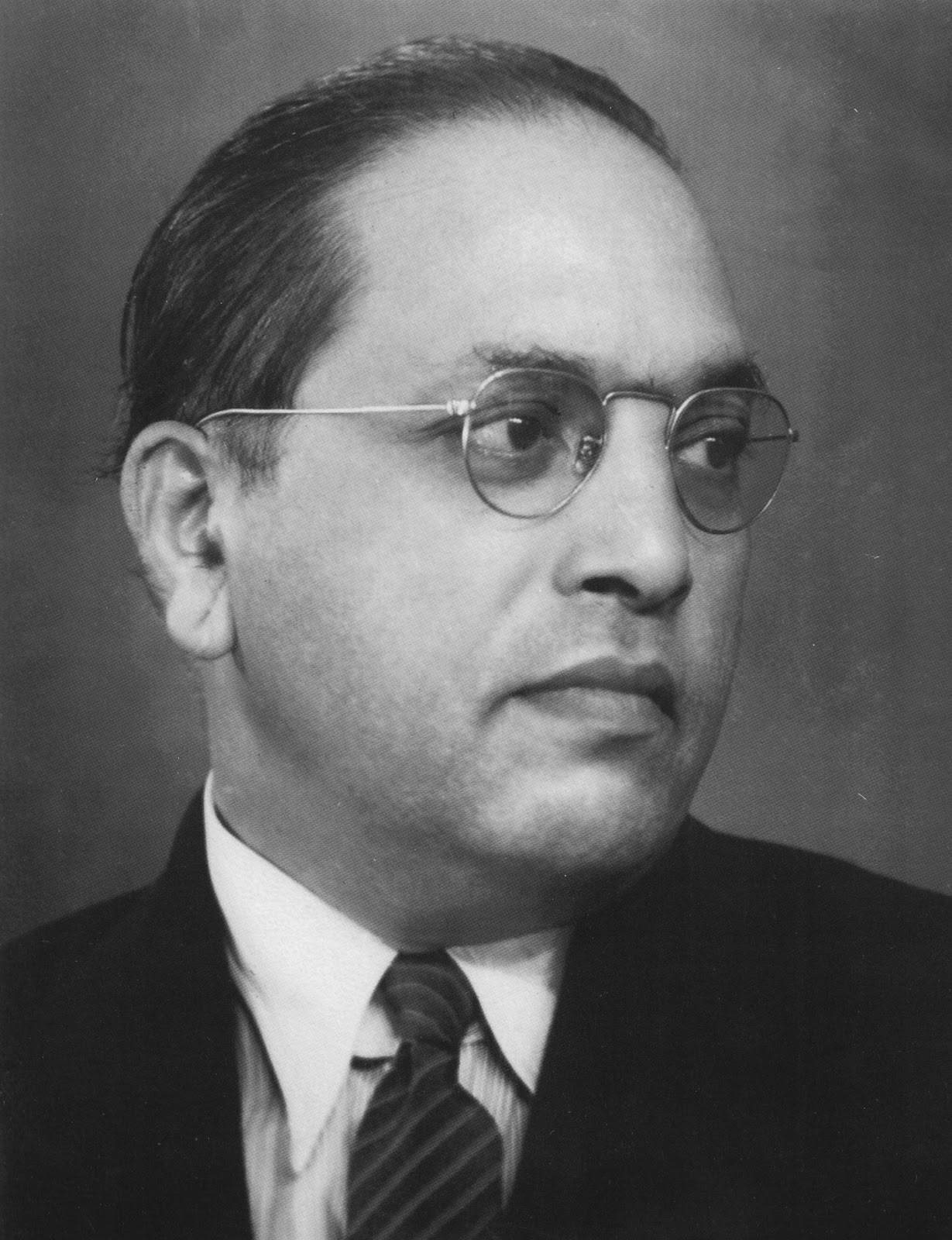
B. R. Ambedkar, a polymath and Social reformer

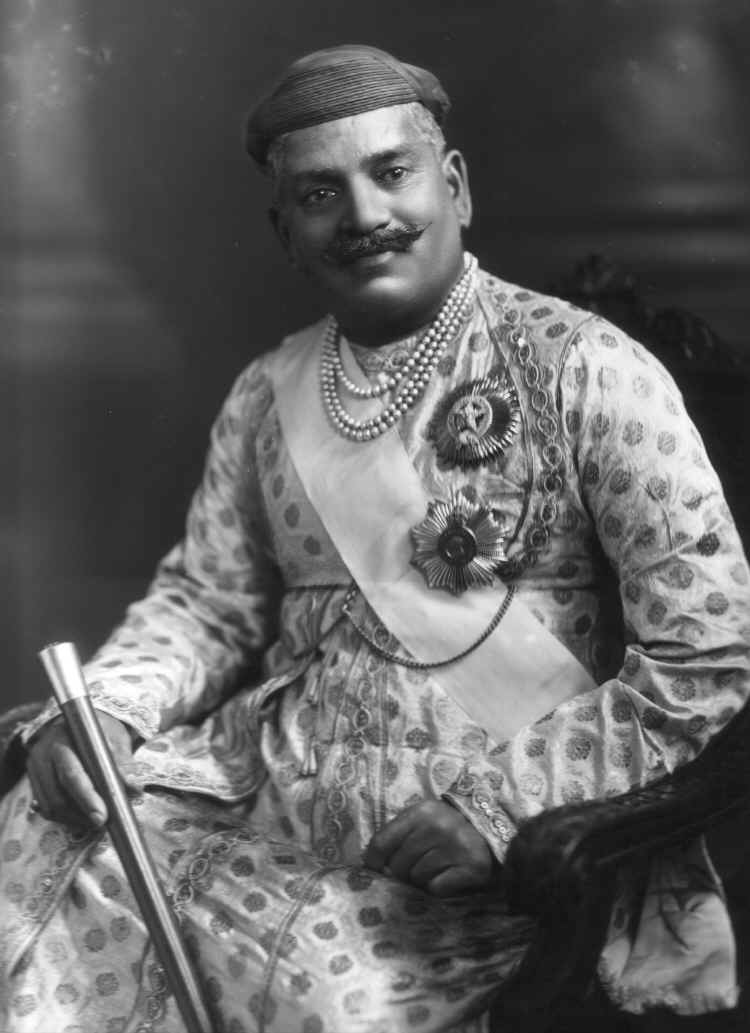
Sayajirao Gaekwad III, the Maratha Maharaja of Baroda

The British rule of more than a century in the present-day Maharashtra region saw huge changes for the Marathi people in every aspect of their lives. Areas that correspond to present-day Maharashtra were under direct or indirect British rule, first under the East India Trading Company and then under the British Raj, from 1858. During this era Marathi people resided in the Bombay presidency, Berar, Central provinces, Hyderabad state and in various princely states that are currently part of present-day Maharashtra. The 1951 census of India had 4.5 million people in the erstwhile Hyderabad state who stated Marathi as their mother tongue. Significant Marathi populations also resided in Maratha princely states far from Maharashtra such as Baroda, Gwalior, Indore, and Tanjore.

The British colonial period saw standardisation of Marathi grammar through the efforts of the Christian missionary William Carey. Carey also published the first dictionary of Marathi in Devanagari script. The most comprehensive Marathi-English dictionary was compiled by Captain James Thomas Molesworth and Major Thomas Candy in 1831. The book is still in print nearly two centuries after its publication. Molesworth also worked on standardising Marathi. He used Brahmins of Pune for this task and adopted the Sanskrit-dominated dialect spoken by this caste in the city as the standard dialect for Marathi. The introduction of printing, standardisation of Marathi, and establishment of modern schools and colleges during the early colonial era led to the spread of literacy and knowledge to many different sections of society such as women, the dalits and the cultivator classes.

The Marathi community played an important part in the social and religious reform movements, as well as the Indian nationalist movement of the late 19th and early 20th centuries. Notable civil society bodies founded by Marathi leaders during the 19th century include the Poona Sarvajanik Sabha, the Prarthana Samaj, the Arya Mahila Samaj, and the Satya Shodhak Samaj. The Pune Sarvajanik Sabha took an active part in relief efforts during the famine of 1875–1876. It is considered the forerunner of the Indian National Congress established in 1885. The most prominent personalities of Indian nationalism in the late 19th and early 20th century, Gopal Krishna Gokhale and Bal Gangadhar Tilak, on opposite sides of the political spectrum, were both Marathi. Tilak was instrumental in using Shivaji and Ganesh worship in forging a collective Maharashtrian identity for the Marathi people. Marathi social reformers of the colonial era include Mahatma Jyotirao Phule and his wife Savitribai Phule, Justice Ranade, feminist Tarabai Shinde, Dhondo Keshav Karve, Vitthal Ramji Shinde, and Pandita Ramabai. Jyotirao Phule was a pioneer in opening schools for girls and Marathi dalits castes.

The non-Brahmin Hindu castes started organising at the beginning of the 20th century with the blessing of Shahu, the ruler of the princely state of Kolhapur. The campaign took off in the early 1920s under the leadership of Keshavrao Jedhe and Baburao Javalkar. Both belonged to the non-Brahmin party. Capturing the Ganpati and Shivaji festivals from Brahmin domination were their early goals. They combined nationalism with anti-casteism as the party's aims. Later on in the 1930s, Jedhe merged the non-Brahmin party with the Congress party and changed that party from an upper-caste-dominated body to a more broadly based but also Maratha-dominated party.

The early 20th century also saw the rise of B. R. Ambedkar, who led the campaign for the rights of the dalits caste that included his own Mahar caste.

The Hindu nationalist organisation Rashtriya Swayamsevak Sangh (RSS) was founded and led by Marathis from Nagpur for many decades. Vinayak Damodar Savarkar (1889–1966), a Marathi from Nashik district, an Indian independence activist, who advocated violence to overthrow British rule in his youth, later formulated the Hindu nationalist philosophy of Hindutva. He was a leading figure in the Hindu Mahasabha. Savarkar's Hindutva philosophy remains the guiding principle for organisations that are part of the RSS-affiliated organisations.

Although the British originally regarded India as a place for the supply of raw materials for the factories of England, by the end of the 19th century a modern manufacturing industry was developing in the city of Mumbai. The main product was cotton and the bulk of the workforce in these mills was of Marathi origin from Western Maharashtra, but more specifically from the coastal Konkan region. The census recorded for the city in the first half of the 20th century showed nearly half the city's population listed Marathi as their mother tongue.

During the period of 1835–1907, a large number of Indians, including Marathi people, were taken to the island of Mauritius as indentured labourers to work on sugarcane plantations. The Marathi people on the island form the oldest diaspora of Marathi people outside India.

=== Since Indian independence in 1947 ===
After India gained independence from Britain in 1947, all princely states lying within the borders of the Bombay Presidency acceded to the Indian Union and were integrated into the newly created Bombay State in 1950.

The small community of Marathi Jews (Bene Israel – Sons of Israel) started emigrating to the newly created country of Israel in the late 1940s and early 1950s. The number of Bene Israel remaining in India was estimated to be around 4,000–5,000 in 1988.

In 1956, the States Reorganisation Act reorganised the Indian states along linguistic lines, and the Bombay Presidency State was enlarged by the addition of the predominantly Marathi-speaking regions of Marathwada (Aurangabad Division) from the erstwhile Hyderabad state and the Vidarbha region from the Central Provinces and Berar. The enlarged state also included Gujarati-speaking areas. The southernmost part of Bombay State was ceded to Mysore. From 1954 to 1955, Marathi people strongly protested against the bilingual Bombay State, and the Samyukta Maharashtra Samiti was formed to agitate for a Marathi-speaking state.

At the same time, the Mahagujarat Movement was started, seeking a separate Gujarati-speaking state. A number of mainly Pune-based leaders such as Keshavrao Jedhe, S.M. Joshi, Shripad Amrit Dange, and Pralhad Keshav Atre formed the Samyukta Maharashtra Movement, alongside Vidarbha-based leaders such as Gopalrao Khedkar, to fight for a separate state of Maharashtra with Mumbai as its state capital. Mass protests, 105 deaths, and heavy losses in the Marathi-speaking areas by the ruling Congress Party in the 1957 election, led the government under Prime Minister Jawaharlal Nehru to change its policy and agree to the protesters' demands. On 1 May 1960, the separate Marathi-speaking state was formed by dividing the earlier Bombay State into the new states of Maharashtra and Gujarat. The city of Mumbai was declared the capital of the new state. The state continues to have a dispute with Karnataka regarding the districts of Belgaum and Karwar, both with a large population of Marathi people.

For the first time, the creation of Maharashtra brought most Marathi people under one state with the mainly rural Kunbi-Maratha community as the largest social group. This group has dominated the rural economy and politics of the state since 1960. The community accounts for 31% of the population of Maharashtra. They dominate the cooperative institutions and with the resultant economic power control politics from the village level up to the Assembly and Lok Sabha seats. Since the 1980s, this group has also been active in setting up private educational institutions. Major past political figures of Maharashtra have been from this group. The rise of the Hindu nationalist Shiv Sena and the Bharatiya Janata Party in recent years have not dented Maratha caste representation in the Maharashtra Legislative assembly.

After the Maratha-Kunbi cluster, the scheduled caste (SC) Mahars are numerically the second-largest community among the Marathi people in Maharashtra. Most of them embraced Buddhism in 1956 with their leader, B. R. Ambedkar. Writers from this group in the 1950s and 1960s were pioneers of Dalit Literature.

The Portuguese-occupied enclave of Goa was liberated in 1962. The main political party formed immediately after liberation was the Maharashtrawadi Gomantak Party. It wanted Goa to merge with Maharashtra because of the affinity between Goan Hindus and the Marathi people. However, the referendum held on this issue rejected the merger. Later, Konkani was made the official language of Goa, but Marathi is also allowed in any government correspondence.

The 1960s also saw the establishment by Bal Thackeray of Shiv Sena, a populist sectarian party advocating the rights of Marathi people in the heterogeneous city of Mumbai. Early campaigns by Shiv Sena advocated for more opportunities for Marathi people in government jobs. The party also led a campaign against the city's South Indian population. By the 1980s the party had captured power in the Mumbai Corporation, and in the 1990s it led the government of Maharashtra's coalition with the Bharatiya Janata Party (BJP). During this transition from founding to capturing power, the party toned down its rhetoric against non-Marathi people and adopted a more Hindu nationalist stance.

== Castes and communities ==
The Marathi people form an ethnolinguistic group that is distinct from others in terms of its language, history, cultural and religious practices, social structure, literature, and art.

The traditional caste hierarchy was headed by the Brahmin castes-the Deshasthas, Chitpavans, Karhades, Saraswats, and the Chandraseniya Kayastha Prabhus. In Mumbai during British rule, this included the Pathare Prabhu and the other communities. The Marathas are 32% in Western Maharashtra and the Kunbis were 7%, whereas the Other Backward Class population (other than the Kunbi) was 27%. The other castes in the intermediate category include: Gujjars, Lingayats and Rajputs who migrated centuries ago to Maharashtra from northern and southern India – and settled in Maharashtra. The population of the Mangs was 8%.

=== Hindu castes in Maharashtra ===
Majority of Marathi Hindu belong either to the cultivator caste cluster of Maratha and Kunbi, or one of the former village servant (Bara Balutedar) castes which include ‌Shimpi (Tailor), Lohar (Iron-smith), Suthar (carpenters), Mali (florists and cultivators), Dhobhi or Parit (washer), Gurav (village priest), Kumbhar (potters), Sonar (Goldsmith), Teli (oil pressers), Lingayats, Chambhar (cobbler), Mang (rope makers), Koli (fishermen or water carriers) and Nabhik (barbers). The Mahar were one of the balutedar who adopted Buddhism in 1950s. Some of the other Marathi castes are:

- Agri – A community from coastal region of Mumbai, Thane and Raigad districts. The community has become quite prosperous in recent decades by taking advantage of opportunities offered by rapid industrialisation of this region.
- Banjara – Formerly a nomadic group
- Bhandari – Traditional extractors of Tadi from palm trees
- Bhoi – Traditionally a people carrier community employed by the rulers
- Brahmin – Priests and writers; these are divided into many sub-castes
- Chandraseniya Kayastha Prabhu - Writer, accountant community, sometimes also priests.
- Dhangar – Traditionally a nomadic shepherd caste
- Leva Patil
- Lingayat Vani – Traders, Zamindars and sometimes priests.
- Lonari
- Pathare Prabhu
- Ramoshi – Soldiers and watchman under Peshwa
- Somvanshi Kshatriya Pathare
- Twashta Kasar – Artisan caste who traditionally worked with brass.
- Vaishya Vani – A trader caste from Goa who are Konkani speakers and found in Maharashtra and Gujarat.
- Vanjari - Commissariats of armies, Warriors, Merchants, Cultivators and Landholders.

=== Non-Hindu communities ===
- Marathi Buddhist – Most members are from the former Mahar community
- Marathi Muslims
- Christians – Marathi Christian communities include Bombay East Indians, based in Greater Mumbai region who are mainly Catholic, Korlai Portuguese Creole and Protestant Marathi Christians, based mainly in Ahmadnagar district.
- Konkani Muslims
- Sikhs
- Marathi Jains
- Bene Israel (Marathi Jews)

== Marathi diaspora ==
=== In other Indian states ===
As the Maratha Empire expanded across India, the Marathi population started migrating out of Maharashtra alongside their rulers. Peshwa, Holkars, Scindia, and Gaekwad dynastic leaders took with them a considerable population of priests, clerks, army men, businessmen, and workers when they established new seats of power. Most of these migrants were from the literate classes such as various Brahmin sub-castes and CKP. These groups formed the backbone of administration in the new Maratha Empire states in many places such as Vyara-Songadh of (Surat), Baroda (Vadodara), Indore, Gwalior, Bundelkhand, and Tanjore. Many families belonging to these groups still follow Marathi traditions even though they have lived more than 1,000 kilometres (620 mi) from Maharashtra for more than 200 years.

Other people have migrated in modern times in search of jobs outside Maharashtra. These people have also settled in almost all parts of the country. They have set up community organisations called Maharashtra Mandals in many cities across the country. A national level central organisation, the Brihan Maharashtra Mandal was formed in 1958 to promote Marathi culture outside Maharashtra. Several sister organisations of the Brihan Maharashtra Mandal have also been formed outside India.

=== Population in India by state ===
State	Marathi speakers(2011)	Percentage-2011
India	83,026,680	6.86% ( Third most spoken in India )
Maharashtra	77,461,172	69.93%
Karnataka	2,064,906	5.38%
Tamil Nadu	85,454	0.12%
Andhra Pradesh/Telangana	674,928	2.80%
Chhattisgarh	144,035	0.56%
Odisha	8,617	0.02%
West Bengal	14,815	0.02%
Gujarat	920,345	3.52%
Puducherry	890	0.07%
Kerala	31,642	0.09%
Andaman and Nicobar Islands	639	0.17%
Jharkhand	8,481	0.03%
Delhi	27,239	0.16%
Assam	11,641	0.04%
Madhya Pradesh	1,231,285	2.70%
Goa	158,787	12.89%
Rajasthan	23,240	0.03%
Punjab	20,392	0.07%
Jammu and Kashmir	23,006	0.18%
Haryana	12,806	0.05%
Tripura	1,412	0.04%
Uttarakhand	6,028	0.06%
Arunachal Pradesh	2,297	0.17%
Nagaland	2,659	0.13%
Chandigarh	1,252	0.12%
Himachal Pradesh	3,438	0.05%
Manipur	1,583	0.06%
Dadra and Nagar Haveli	24,105	7.01%
Meghalaya	20,751	0.70%
Sikkim	1,138	0.19%
Daman and Diu	11,008	4.53%
Mizoram	408	0.04%
Lakshadweep	26	0.04%
Bihar	1,975	0.001%
Uttar Pradesh	24,280	0.01%

=== International diaspora ===
In the mid-1800s, a large number of Indian people were taken to Mauritius, Fiji, Trinidad and Tobago, South Africa, and Eastern Africa as indentured labourers to work on sugarcane plantations. The majority of these migrants were from the Hindustani speaking areas or from Southern India, however, a significant number of immigrants to Mauritius were Marathis.

Since the state of Israel was established in 1948, around 25,000–30,000 Indian Jews have emigrated there, of which around 20,000 were from the Marathi speaking Bene Israel community of Konkan.

Indians, including Marathi People, have migrated to Europe and particularly Great Britain for more than a century. The Maharashtra Mandal of London was founded in 1932. A small number of Marathi people also settled in British East Africa during the colonial era. After the African Great Lakes countries of Kenya, Uganda and Tanganyika gained independence from Britain, most of the South Asian population residing there, including Marathi people, migrated to the United Kingdom, or India.

Large-scale immigration of Indians into the United States started when the Immigration and Nationality Act of 1965 came into effect. Most of the Marathi immigrants who came after 1965 were professionals such as doctors, engineers or scientists. The second wave of immigration took place during the I.T. boom of the 1990s and later.

Since the 1990s due to the I.T. boom and because of the general ease of travel, Marathi people are now found in greater numbers in all corners of the world including the United States, Australia, Canada, the Gulf countries, and European countries.

After the third battle of Panipat, Marathi people settled in Sindh and Balochisthan region (modern day Pakistan). After partition of India, many Marathi Hindus came to India. But, 500–1000 Marathi Hindus also lives in Karachi city of Sindh province.

== Culture ==
=== Food ===
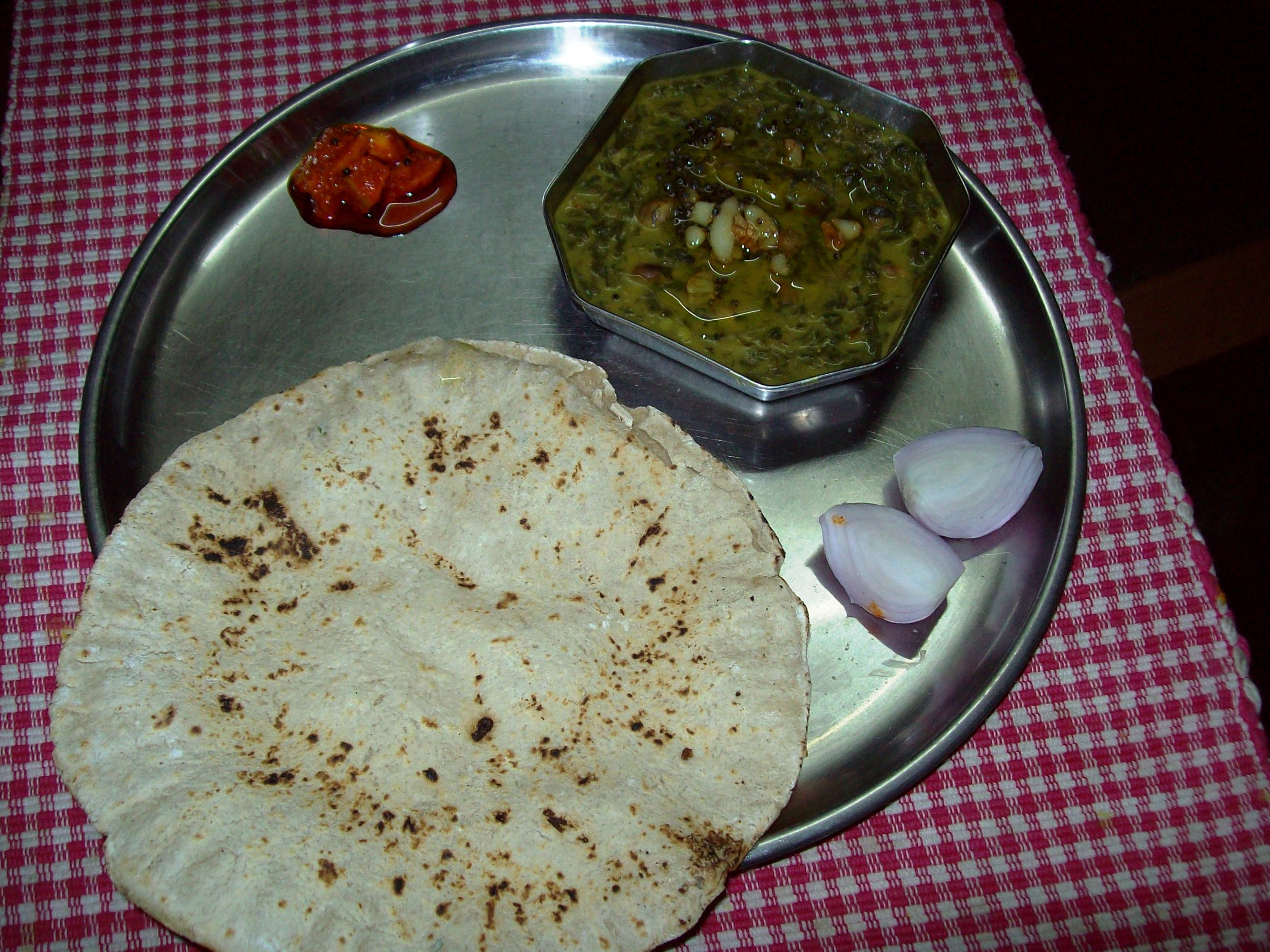
A simple Maharashtrian meal with bhaaji, bhakari, raw onion and pickle

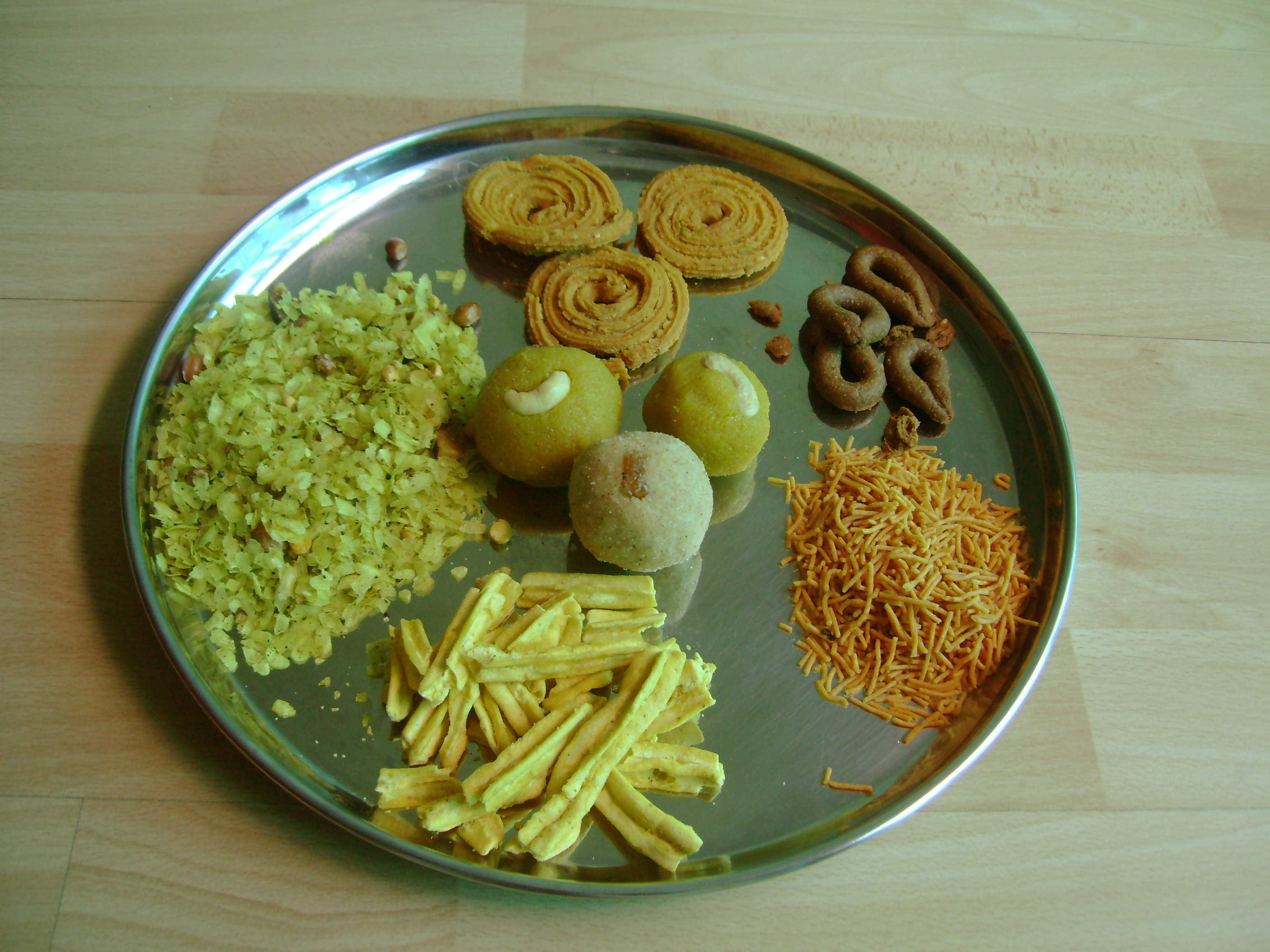
A typical Diwali plate of snack (pharal). Clockwise from top: chakli, kadboli, shev, gaathi, chivda and in the center are yellow besan and white rava ladu.

The many communities in Marathi society result in a diverse cuisine. This diversity extends to the family level because each family uses its own unique combination of spices. The majority of Maharashtrians do eat meat and eggs, but the Brahmin community is mostly lacto-vegetarian. The traditional staple food on Desh (the Deccan plateau) is usually bhakri, spiced cooked vegetables, dal and rice. Bhakri is an unleavened bread made using Indian millet (jowar), bajra or bajri. However, the North Maharashtrians and urbanites prefer roti, which is a plain bread made with wheat flour. In the coastal Konkan region, rice is the traditional staple food. An aromatic variety of ambemohar rice is more popular among Marathi people than the internationally known basmati rice. Malvani dishes use more wet coconut and coconut milk in their preparation. In the Vidarbha region, little coconut is used in daily preparations but dry coconut, along with peanuts, is used in dishes such as spicy savjis or mutton and chicken dishes.

Thalipeeth is a popular traditional breakfast flat bread that is prepared using bhajani, a mixture of many different varieties of roasted lentils.

Marathi Hindu people observe fasting days when traditional staple food like rice and chapatis are avoided. However, milk products and non-native foods such as potatoes, peanuts and sabudana preparations (sabudana khicdi) are allowed, which result in a carbohydrate-rich alternative fasting cuisine.

Some Maharashtrian dishes including sev bhaji, misal pav and patodi are distinctly regional dishes within Maharashtra.

In metropolitan areas including Mumbai and Pune, the pace of life makes fast food very popular. The most popular forms of fast food among Marathi people in these areas are: bhaji, vada pav, misal pav and pav bhaji. More traditional dishes are sabudana khichdi, pohe, upma, sheera and panipuri. Most Marathi fast food and snacks are purely lacto-vegetarian in nature.

In South Konkan, near Malvan, an independent exotic cuisine has developed called Malvani cuisine, which is predominantly non-vegetarian. Kombdi vade, fish preparations and baked preparations are more popular here. Kombdi Vade, is a recipe from the Konkan region. Deep fried flatbread made from spicy rice and urid flour served with chicken curry, more specifically with Malvani chicken curry.

Desserts are an important part of Marathi food and include puran poli, shrikhand, basundi, kheer, gulab jamun, and modak. Traditionally, these desserts were associated with a particular festival, for example, modaks are prepared during the Ganpati Festival.

=== Attire ===
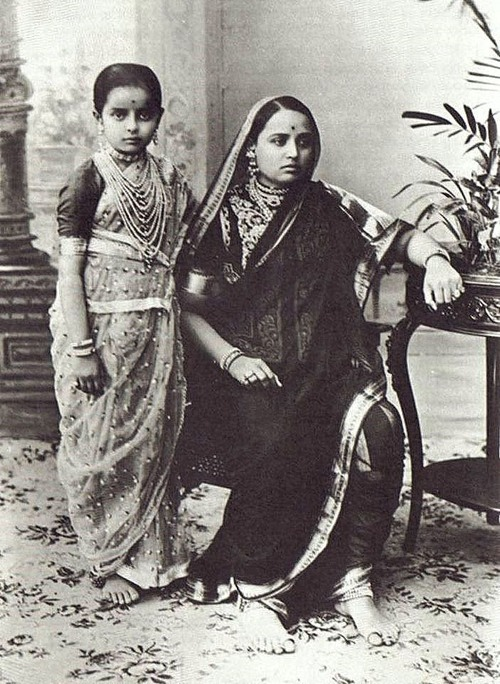
Princess Indira Raje (1892-1968) of Baroda as a young girl with her mother, Chimnabai II, wearing a 'Nauvari', a traditional Maharashtrian sari

Traditionally, Marathi women commonly wore the sari, often distinctly designed according to local cultural customs. Most middle aged and young women in urban Maharashtra dress in western outfits such as skirts and trousers or salwar kameez with the traditionally nauvari or nine-yard sari, disappearing from the markets due to a lack of demand. Older women wear the five-yard sari. In urban areas, the five-yard sari is worn by younger women for special occasions such as weddings and religious ceremonies. Among men, western dress has greater acceptance. Men also wear traditional costumes such as the dhoti and pheta on cultural occasions. The Gandhi cap along with a long white shirt and loose pajama style trousers is the popular attire among older men in rural Maharashtra. Women wear traditional jewellery derived from Marathas and Peshwas dynasties. Kolhapuri saaj, a special type of necklace, is also worn by Marathi women. In urban areas, many women and men wear western attire.

=== Religion ===
The majority of Marathi people are Hindus. Minorities by religion include Muslims, Buddhists, Jains, Christians, Parsis and Jews.

=== Marathi Hindu customs ===
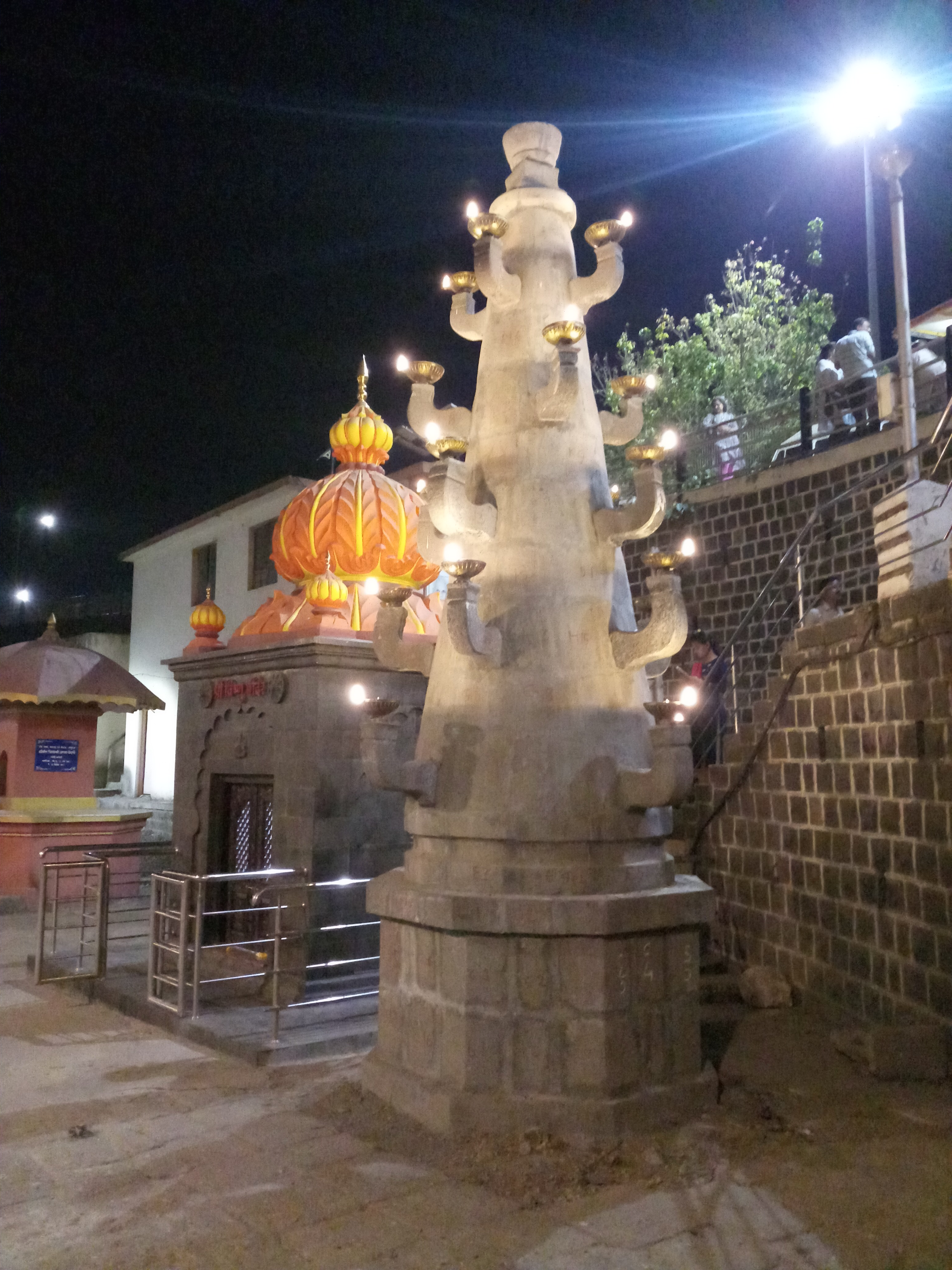
Deepmala Deep Stamb in Omkareshwar Temple in Pune

The main life ceremonies in Hindu culture include those related to birth, weddings, initiation ceremonies, as well as death rituals. Other ceremonies for different occasions in Hindu life include Vastushanti and "Satyanarayan" which is performed before a family formally establishes residence in a new house. Satyanarayana Puja is a ceremony performed before commencing any new endeavour or for no particular reason. Invoking the name of the family's gotra and the kuladevata are important aspects of these ceremonies for many communities.

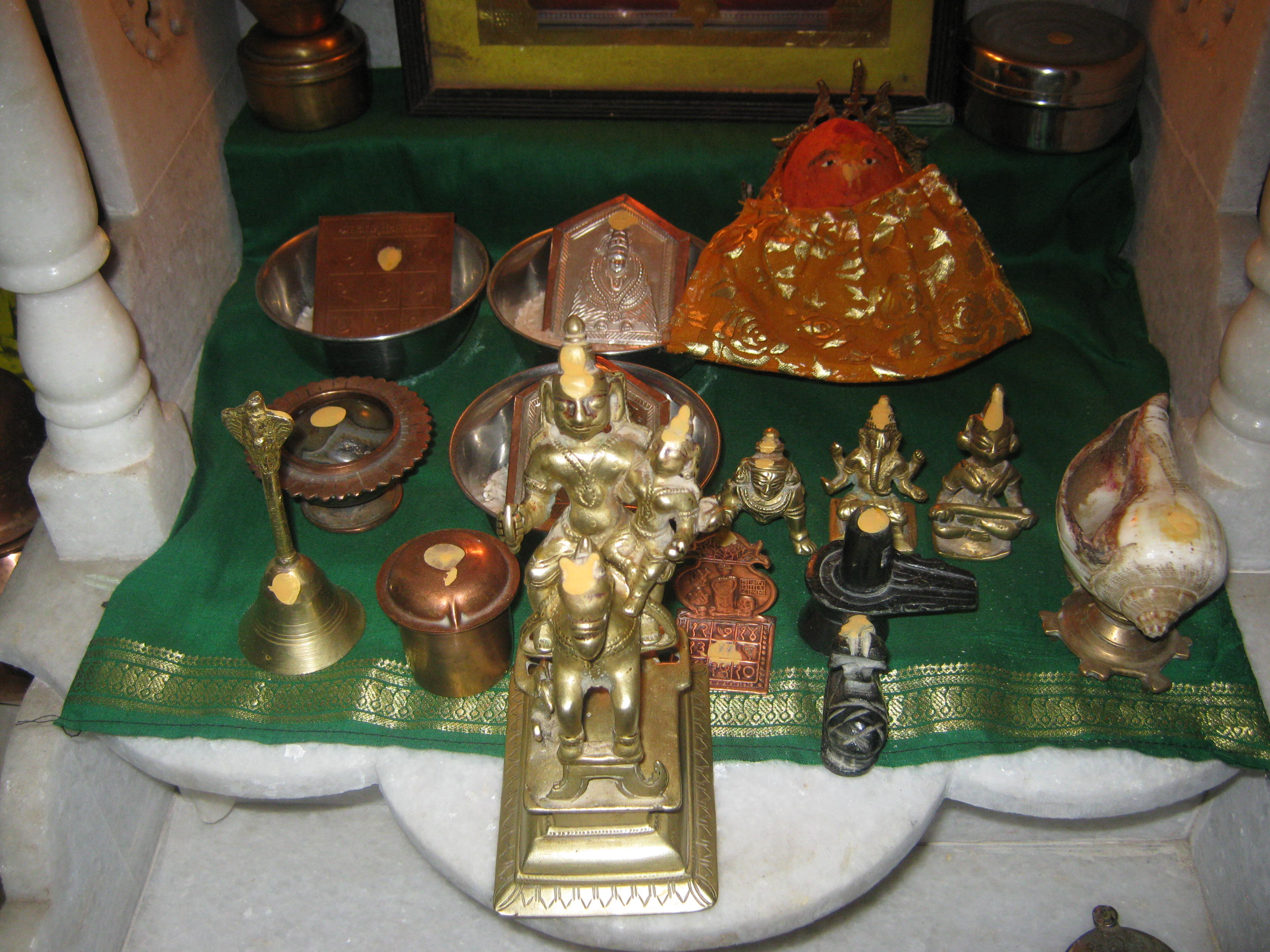
A Marathi household shrine with Khandoba at the forefront

Like most other Hindu communities, the Marathi people have a household shrine called a devaghar with idols, symbols, and pictures of various deities for daily worship. Ritual reading of religious texts known as pothi is also popular in some communities.

In some traditional families, food is first offered to the preferred deity in the household shrine, as naivedya, before being consumed by family members and guests. Meals or snacks are not taken before this religious offering. In present times, the naivedya is offered by families only on days of special religious significance.

Many Marathi people trace their paternal ancestors to one of the seven or eight sages, the Saptarshi. They classify themselves as gotras, named after the ancestor rishi. Intra-marriage within gotras (Sagotra Vivaha) was uncommon until recently, being discouraged as it was likened to incest.

Most Marathi families have their own family patron or protective deity or the kuladevata. This deity is common to a lineage or a clan of several families who are connected to each other through a common ancestor. The Khandoba of Jejuri is an example of a kuladevata of some families; he is a common kuladevata to several castes ranging from Brahmins and Dhangar to Dalits. The practice of worshiping local or territorial deities as kuladevatas began in the period of the Yadava dynasty. Other family deities of the people of Maharashtra are Bhavani of Tuljapur, Mahalaxmi of Kolhapur, Mahalaxmi of Amravati, Renuka of Mahur, Parashuram in Konkan, Saptashringi on Saptashringa hill at Vani in Nasik district, and Balaji. Despite the system of worshipping kuladevatas, the worship of Ganesha, Vitthala, and other popular avatars of Vishnu such as Rama or Krishna are extremely popular across the entire community. The festivals of Ganeshotsav and annual vari pilgrimage to the Vitthal temple at Pandharpur are of significant importance to all Marathis alike.

==== Ceremonies and rituals ====
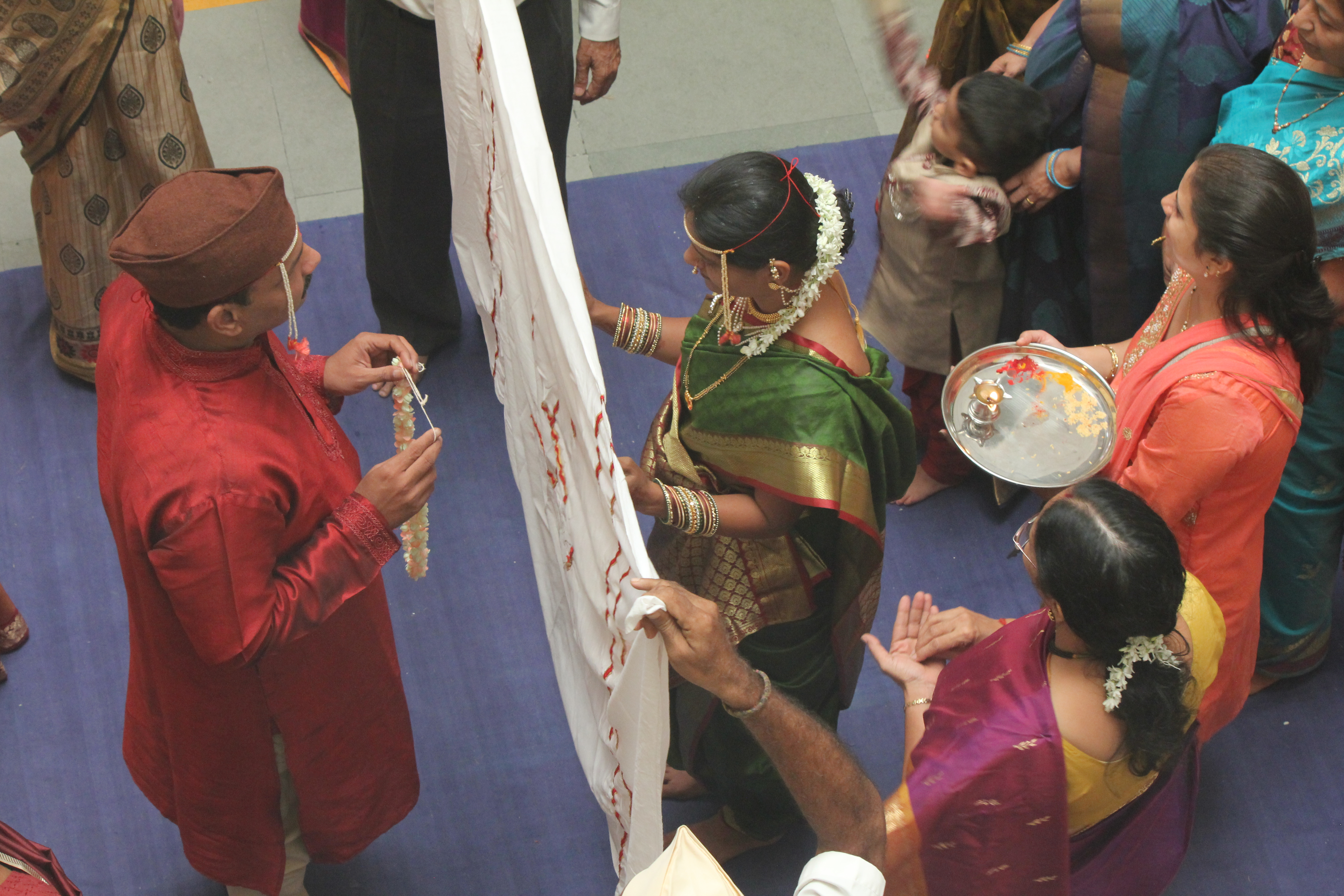
Antarpat and mangalashtaka ceremony, part of the Marathi Hindu wedding ceremony when gathered guests collectively bless the bride and the groom

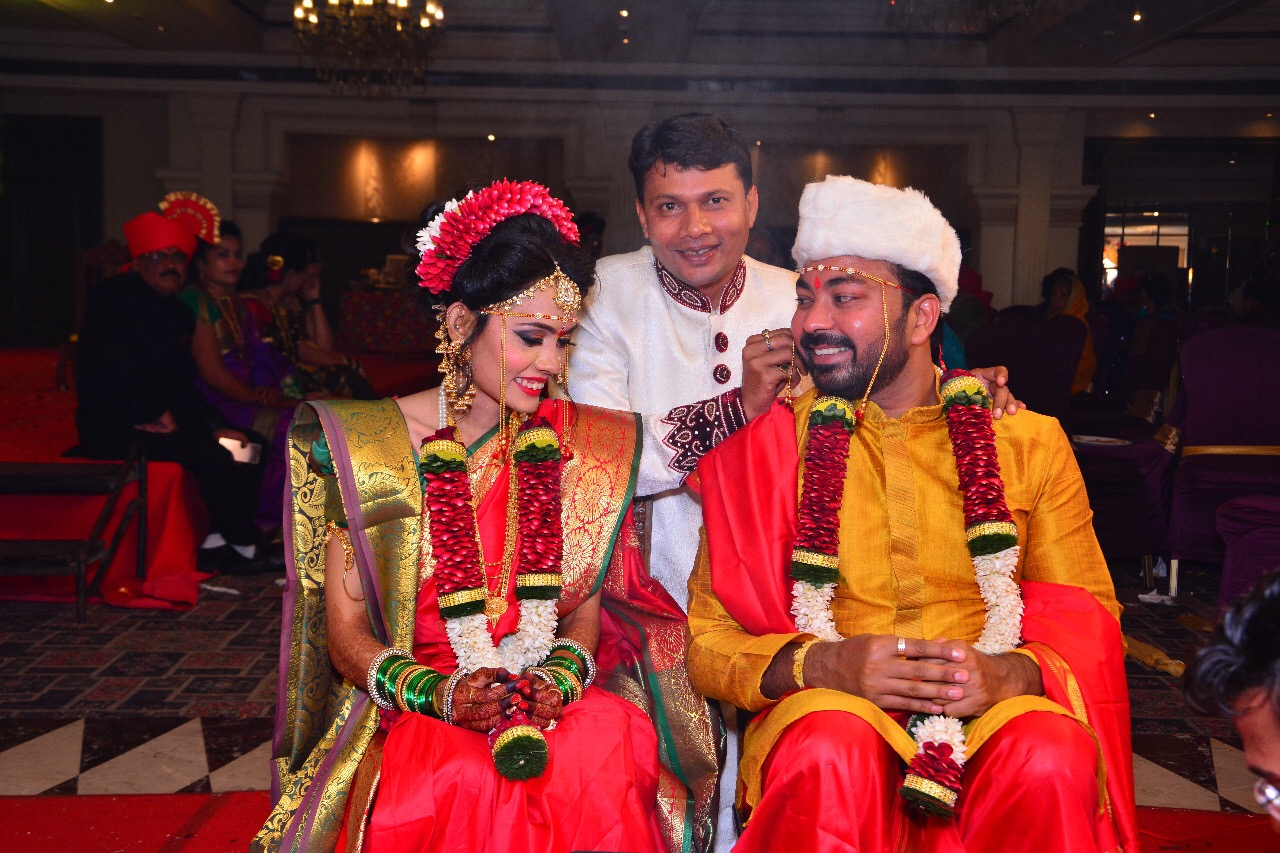
Marathi bride and groom during groom ear-twisting ceremony

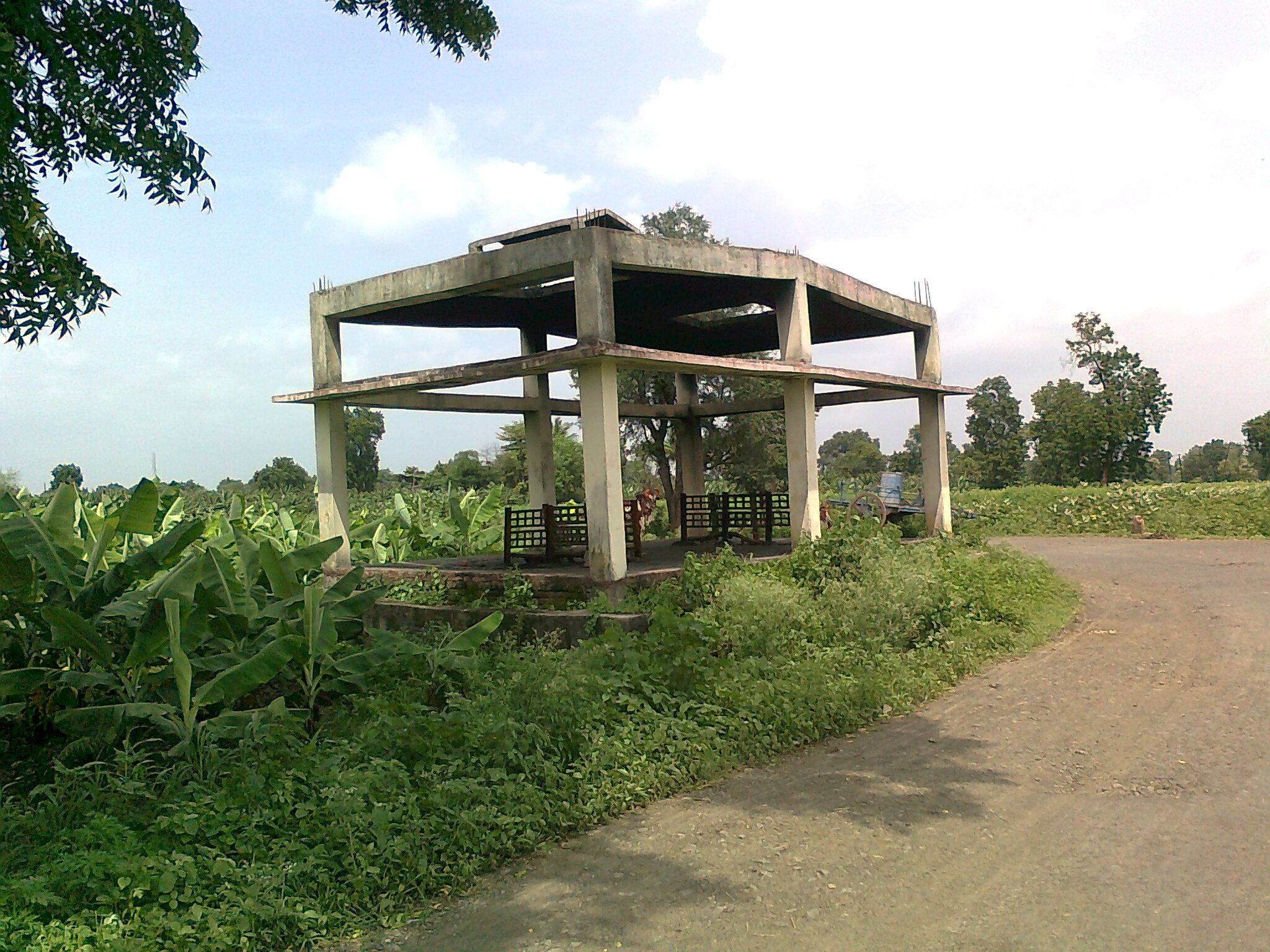
Smashan-bhoomi (cremation place), Chinawal village of Maharashtra

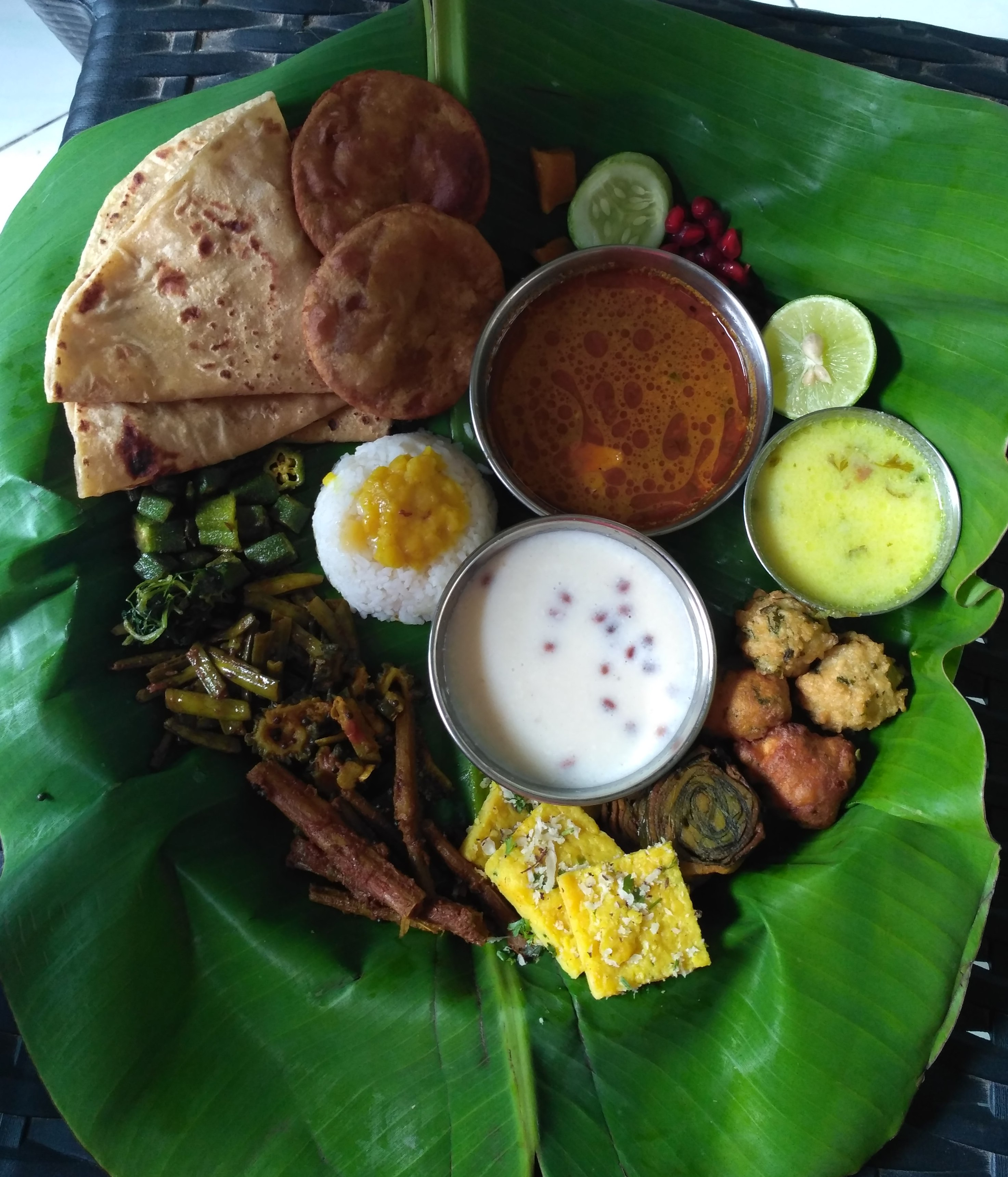
Naivedya (Food offering) for the ancestors during a Pitru paksha ceremony

At birth, a child is initiated into the family ritually. The child's naming ceremony may happen many weeks or even months later, and it is called the bārsa. In many Indian Hindu communities, the naming is most often done by consulting the child's horoscope, which suggests various names depending on the child's lunar sign (called rashi). However, in Marathi Hindu families, the name that the child inevitably uses in secular functions is the one decided by their parents. If a name is chosen on the basis of the horoscope, then that is kept a secret to ward off the casting of a spell on the child during their life. During the naming ceremony, the child's paternal aunt has the honour of naming the infant. When the child is 11 months old, they get their first hair-cut.This is also an important ritual and is called Jawal (जावळ). In the Maratha community, the maternal uncle is given the honour of the first snip during the ceremony.

In Brahman, CKP, Gaud Saraswat Brahman, Gurav, Daivednya, and some Maratha communities when a male child undergoes the initiation thread ceremony variously known as Munja (in reference to the Munja grass that is of official ritual specification), Vratabandha, or Upanayanam.

Marathi Hindu people are historically endogamous within their caste but exogamous with their clan. Cross-cousin alliances are allowed by most Marathi Hindu communities. Hindu marriages, more often than not, take place by negotiation. The mangalasutra is the symbol of marriage for the woman. Studies show that most Indians' traditional views on caste, religion, and family background have remained unchanged when it came to marriage, that is, people marry within their own castes, and matrimonial advertisements in newspapers are still classified by caste and sub-caste.

While arranging a marriage, gana, gotra, pravara, devaka are all kept in mind. Horoscopes are matched. The marriage ceremony is described as follows: 'The groom, along with the bride's party goes to the bride's house. A ritual named Akshata is performed in which people around the groom and bride throw haldi (turmeric) and kunku (vermilion) coloured rice grains on the couple. After the kanyadana ceremony, there is an exchange of garlands between the bride and the groom. Then, the groom ties the Mangalsutra around the neck of the bride. This is followed by granthibandhan in which the end of the bride's sādi/sāri is tied to the end of the groom's dhoti, and a feast is arranged at the groom's place.'

Elements of a traditional Marathi Hindu wedding ceremony include seemant poojan on the wedding eve. The dharmic wedding includes the antarpat ceremony followed by the Vedic ceremony which involves the bridegroom and the bride walking around the sacred fire seven times to complete the marriage. Modern urban wedding ceremonies conclude with an evening reception. A Marathi Hindu woman becomes part of her husband's family after marriage and adopts the gotra as well as the traditions of her husband's family. (Note: Until about 300 BC, Hindu men were about 24 years of age when they got married and the girl was always post-pubescent. The social evil of child marriage established itself in Hindu society sometime after 300 BC as a response to foreign invasions. The problem was first addressed in 1860 by amending the Indian Penal Code which required the boy's age to be 14 and the girl's age to be 12 at minimum, for a marriage to be considered legal. In 1927, the Hindu Child Marriage Act made a marriage between a boy under 15 and a girl under 12 illegal. This minimum age requirement was increased to 14 for girls and 18 for boys in 1929. It was again increased by a year for girls in 1948. The Act was amended again in 1978 when the ages were raised to 18 for girls and 21 for boys.)

After weddings and after thread ceremonies, many Maratha, Deshastha Brahmin and Dhangar families arrange a traditional religious singing performance by a Gondhali group.

Decades ago, girls married the groom of their parents' choice by their early teens or before. Even today, girls are married off in their late teens by rural and orthodox educated people. Urban women may choose to remain unmarried until the late 20s or even early 30s.

Marathi Hindu people dispose their dead by cremation. The deceased's son carries the corpse to the cremation ground atop a bier. The eldest son lights the fire for the corpse at the head for males and at the feet for females. The ashes are gathered in an earthen pitcher and immersed in a river on the third day after death. This is a 13-day ritual with the pinda being offered to the dead soul on the 11th and a Śrāddha (Shrāddha) ceremony followed by a funeral feast on the 13th. Cremation is performed according to Vedic rites, usually within a day of the individual's death. Like all other Hindus, the preference is for the ashes to be immersed in a river. Holy rivers such as the Ganges river or Godavari have increasingly become popular for this ritual as travelling has become easier in modern times. Śrāddha becomes an annual ritual in which all forefathers of the family who have passed on are remembered. These rituals are expected to be performed only by male descendants, preferably the eldest son of the deceased. The annual Śrāddha for all the ancestors is usually performed during the Pitru Paksha, the dark fortnight of the Hindu month of Bhadrapada.

=== Hindu calendar and festivals ===
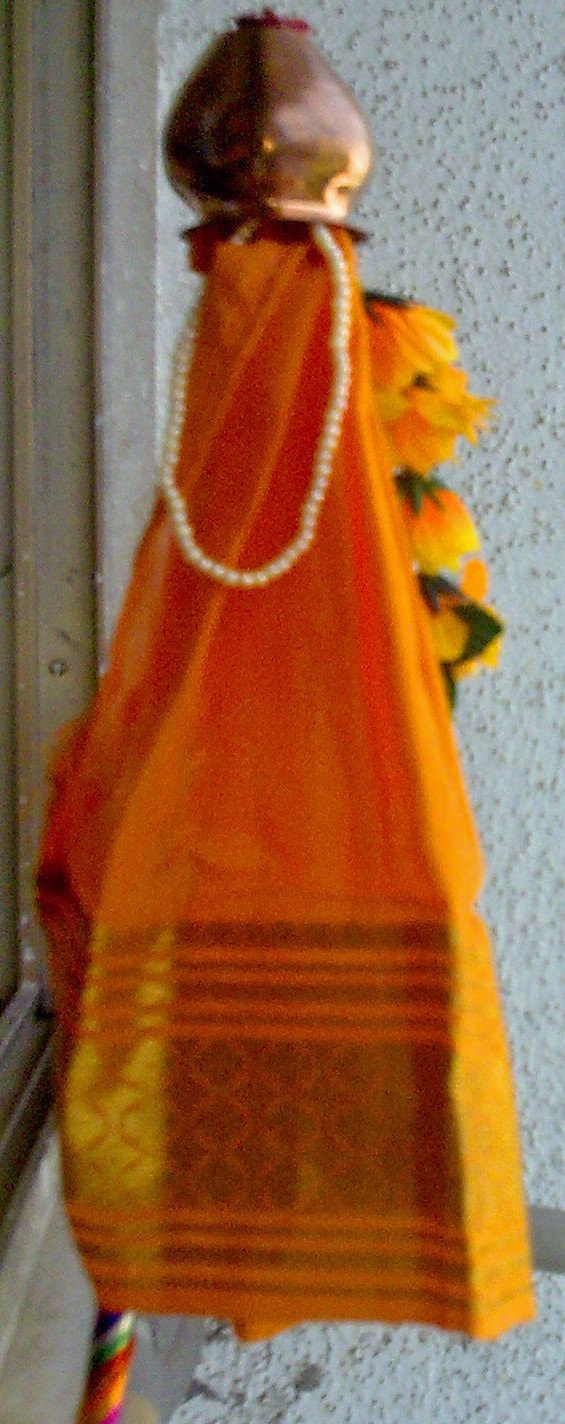
A Gudhi is erected on Gudhi Padwa.

The Marathi, Kannada and Telugu people follow the Deccan Shalivahana Hindu calendar, which may have subtle differences with calendars followed by other communities in India. The calendar follows the Amanta tradition where the lunar month ends on no moon day.

Marathi Hindus celebrate most of the Indian Hindu festivals such as Dasara, Diwali and Raksha Bandhan. These are, however, celebrated with certain Maharashtrian regional variations. Others festivals like Ganeshotsav have a more characteristic Marathi flavour. The festivals described below are in chronological order as they occur during a Shaka year, starting with Shaka new year festival of Gudhi Padwa.

- Gudhi Padwa: A victory pole or Gudi is erected outside homes on the day. This day is considered one of the three-and-a-half most auspicious days of the Hindu calendar and many new ventures and activities such as opening a new business etc. are started on this day. The leaves of Neem or and shrikhand are a part of the day's cuisine. The day is also known as Ugadi, the Kannada and Telugu New Year.
- Akshaya Tritiya: The third day of Vaishakh is celebrated as Akshaya Tritiya. This is one of the three-and-a-half most auspicious days in the Hindu Calendar and usually occurs in the month of April. In the Vidharbha region, this festival is celebrated in remembrance of the departed members of the family. The upper castes feed a Brahmin and married couple on this day. The Mahars community used to celebrate it by offering food to crows. This marks the end of the Haldi-Kunku festival which is a get-together organised by women for women. Married women invite lady friends, relatives, and new acquaintances to meet in an atmosphere of merriment and fun. On such occasions, the hostess distributes bangles, sweets, small novelties, flowers, betel leaves, and nuts as well as coconuts. The snacks include kairichi panhe (raw mango juice) and vatli dal, a dish prepared from crushed chickpeas.
- Vat Pournima: This festival is celebrated on Jyeshtha Pournima (full moon day of the Jyeshtha month in the Hindu calendar), around June. On this day, women fast and worship the banyan tree to pray for the growth and strength of their families, like the sprawling tree which lives for centuries. Married women visit a nearby tree and worship it by tying red threads of love around it. They pray for well-being and long life for their husband.

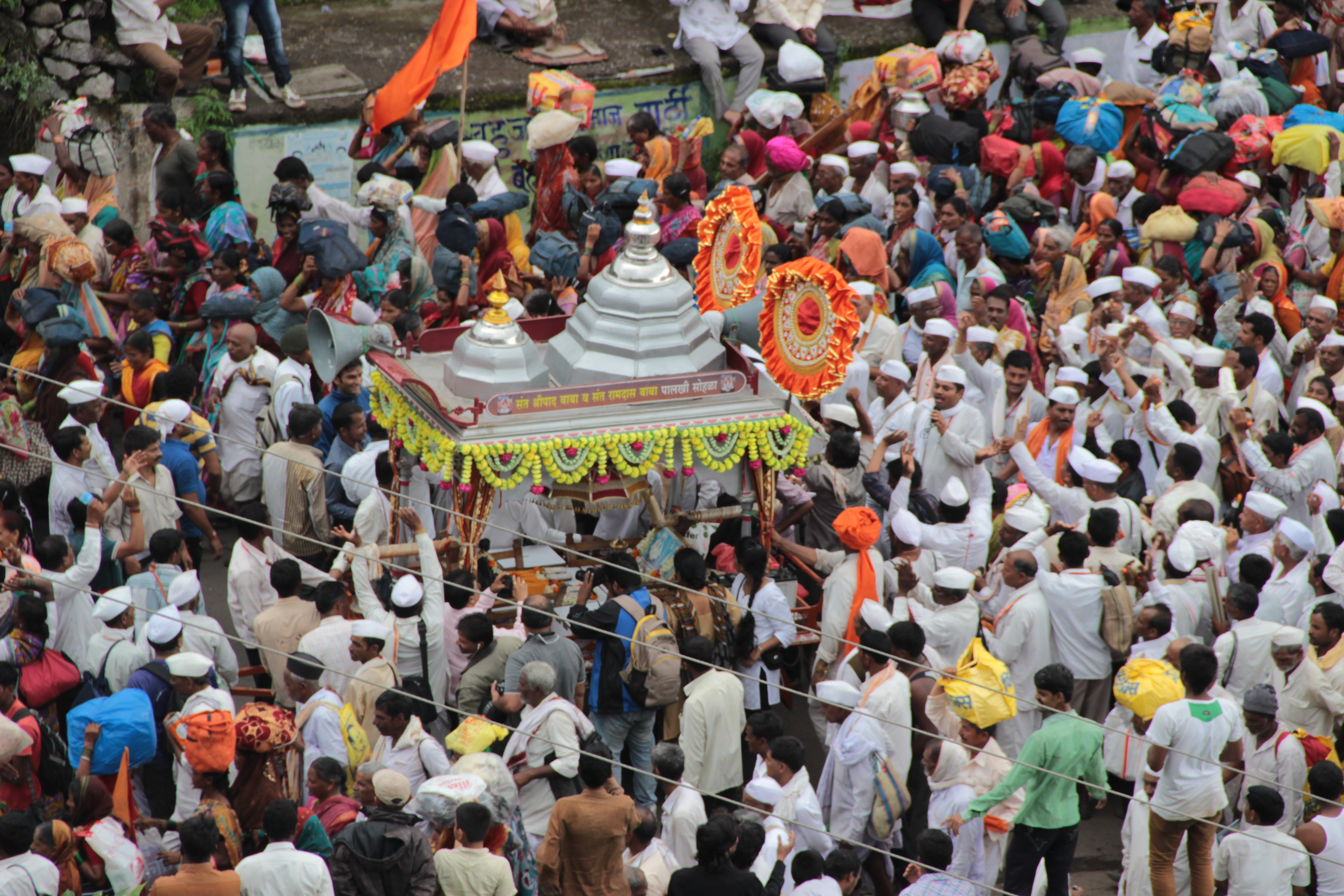
Dnyaneshwar palakhi on its way to Pandharpur

- Ashadhi Ekadashi: Ashadhi Ekadashi (11th day of the month of Ashadha, (falls in July–early August of Gregorian calendar) is closely associated with the Marathi sants Dnyaneshwar, Tukaram and others. Twenty days before this day, thousands of Warkaris start their pilgrimage to Pandharpur from the resting places of the saint. For example, in the case of Dynaneshwar, it starts from Alandi with Dynaneshwar's paduka (symbolic sandals made out of wood) in a Palakhi. Varkaris carry tals or small cymbals in their hand, wear Hindu prayer beads made from tulasi around their necks and sing and dance to the devotional hymns and prayers to Vitthala. People all over Maharashtra fast on this day and offer prayers in the temples. This day marks the start of Chaturmas (The four monsoon months, from Ashadh to Kartik) according to the Hindu calendar. This is one of the most important fasting days for Marathi Hindu people.
- Guru Pournima: The full moon day of the month of Ashadh is celebrated as Guru Pournima. For Hindus Guru-Shishya (teacher-student) tradition is very important, be it educational or spiritual. Gurus are often equated with God and always regarded as a link between the individual and the immortal. On this day spiritual aspirants and devotees worship Maharshi Vyasa, who is regarded as Guru of Gurus.
- Divyanchi Amavasya: The new moon day/last day of the month of Ashadh/आषाढ (falls between June and July of Gregorian Calendar) is celebrated as Divyanchi Amavasya. This new moon signifies the end of the month of Ashadh, and the arrival of the month of Shravan, which is considered the most pious month of the Hindu calendar. On this day, all the traditional lamps of the house are cleaned and fresh wicks are put in. The lamps are then lit and worshiped. People cook a specific item called diva (literally lamp), prepared by steaming sweet wheat dough batter and shaping it like little lamps. They are eaten warm with ghee.
- Nag Panchami: One of the many festivals in India during which Marathi people celebrate and worship nature. Nags (cobras) are worshiped on the fifth day of the month of Shravan (around August) in the Hindu calendar. On Nagpanchami Day, people draw a nag family depicting the male and female snake and their nine offspring or nagkul. The nag family is worshiped and a bowl of milk and wet chandan (sandalwood powder) offered. It is believed that the nag deity visits the household, enjoys languishing in the moist chandan, drinks the milk offering, and blesses the household with good luck. Women put temporary henna tattoos (mehndi) on their hand on the previous day, and buy new bangles on Nagpanchami Day. According to folklore, people refrain from digging the soil, cutting vegetables, frying and roasting on a hot plate on this day, while farmers do not harrow their farms to prevent any accidental injury to snakes. In a small village named Battis Shirala in Maharashtra a big snake festival is held which attracts thousands of tourists from all over the world. In other parts of Maharashtra, snake charmers are seen sitting by the roadsides or moving from one place to another with their baskets holding snakes. While playing the lingering melodious notes on their pungi, they beckon devotees with their calls—Nagoba-la dudh de Mayi ('Give milk to the cobra oh mother!'). Women offer sweetened milk, popcorn (lahya in Marathi) made out of jwari/dhan/corns to the snakes and pray. Cash and old clothes are also given to the snake-charmers. In Barshi Town in the Solapur district, a big jatra (carnival) is held at Nagoba Mandir in Tilak chowk.
- Rakhi Pournima and Narali Pournima: Narali Pournima is celebrated on the full moon day of the month of Shravan in the Shaka Hindu calendar (around August). This is the most important festival for the coastal Konkan region because the new season for fishing starts on this day. Fishermen and women offer coconuts to the sea and ask for a peaceful season while praying for the sea to remain calm. The same day is celebrated as Rakhi Pournima to commemorate the abiding ties between brother and sister in Maharashtra as well other parts of Northern India. Narali bhaat (sweet rice with coconut) is the main dish on this day. On this day, Brahmin men change their sacred thread (Janve; Marathi: जानवे) at a common gathering ceremony called Shraavani (Marathi:श्रावणी).

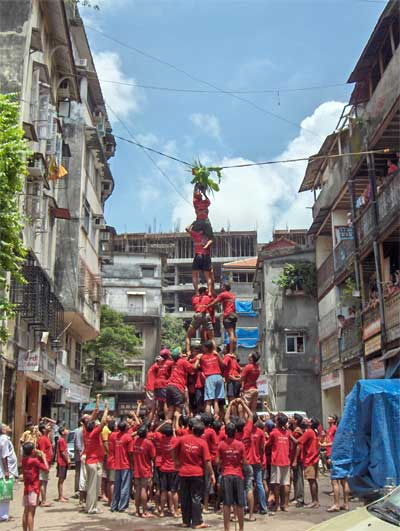
Gokulashtami dahi-handi celebration

- Gokul Ashtami: The birthday of Krishna is celebrated with great fervour all over India on the eighth day of second fortnight of the month Shravan (usually in the month of August). In Maharashtra, Gokul Ashtami is synonymous with the ceremony of dahi handi. This is a reenactment of Krishna's efforts to steal butter from a matka (earthen pot) suspended from the ceiling. Large earthen pots filled with milk, curds, butter, honey, fruits, etc. are suspended at a height of between 20 and 40 feet (6.1 and 12.2 m) in the streets. Teams of young men and boys come forward to claim this prize. They construct a human pyramid by standing on each other's shoulders until the pyramid is tall enough to enable the topmost person to reach the pot and claim the contents after breaking it. Currency notes are often tied to the rope by which the pot is suspended. The prize money is distributed among those who participate in the pyramid building. The dahi-handi draws a huge crowd and they support the teams trying to grab these pots by chanting 'Govinda ala re ala'.

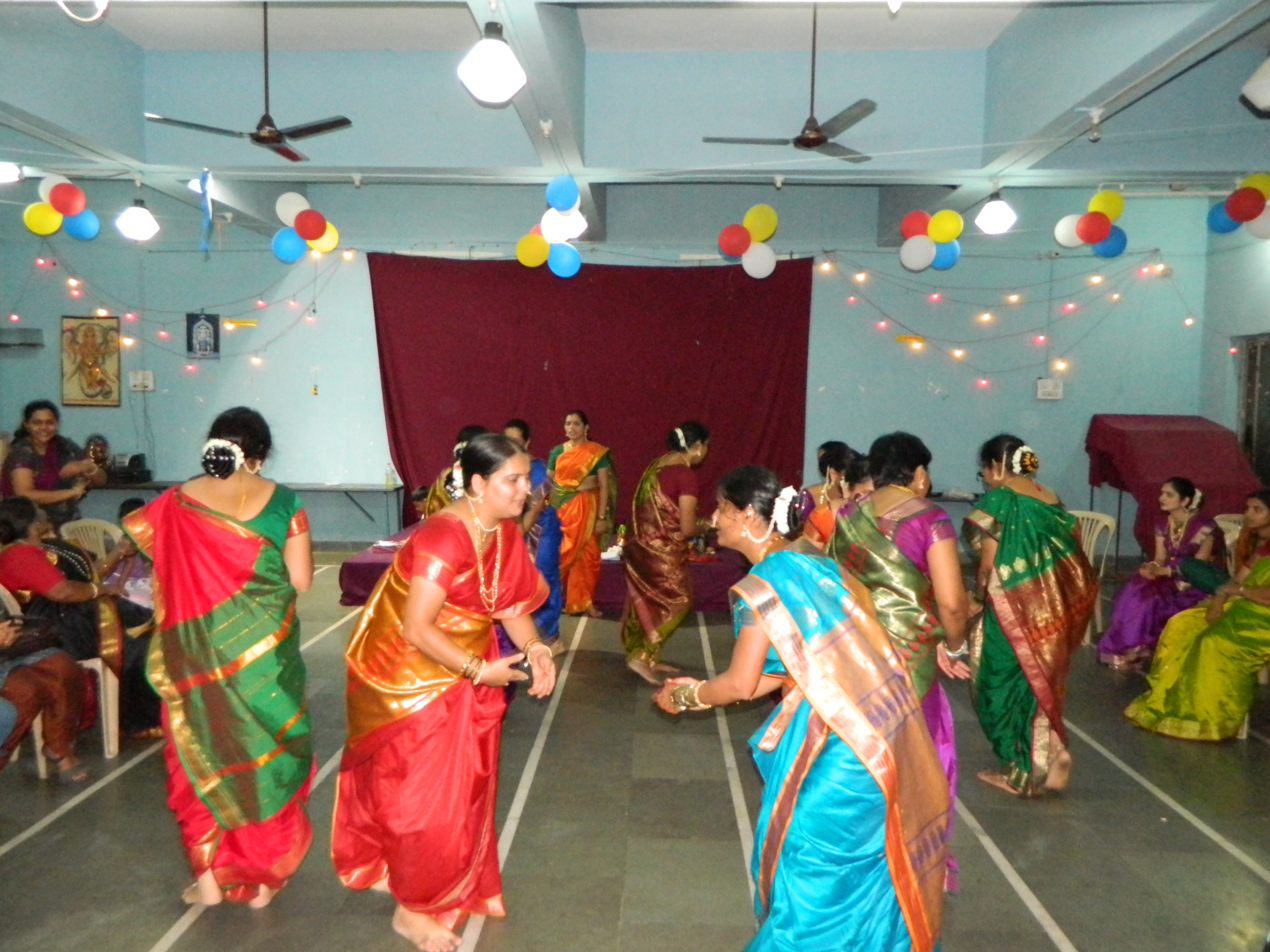
Woman playing Zimma on the night of a Mangala Gauri celebration in the Month of Shravan

- Mangala Gaur: Pahili Mangala Gaur (first Mangala Gaur) is one of the most important celebrations for the new brides among Marathi Brahmins. On the Tuesday of the month of the Shravan falling within a year after her marriage, the new bride performs Shivling puja for the well-being of her husband and new family. It is also a get-together of all womenfolk. It includes chatting, playing games, ukhane (married women take their husband's name woven in 2/4 rhyming liners) and sumptuous food. They typically play zimma, fugadi, bhendya (more popularly known as Antakshari in modern India) until the early hours of the following morning.

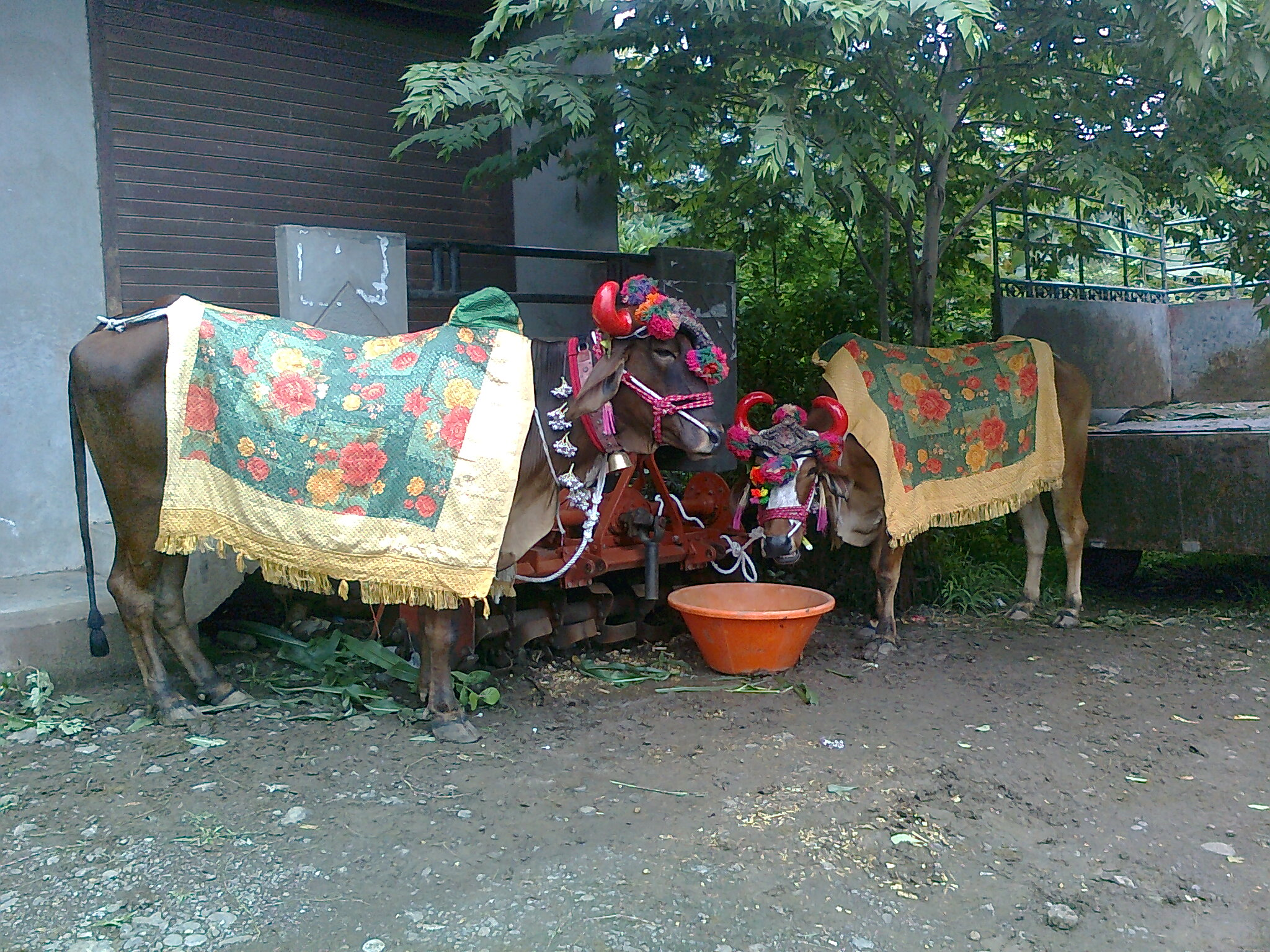
Oxen decorated for Pola in a village.

- Bail Pola: the festival is celebrated on the new moon day (Pithori Amavasya) of the month of Shravan (August - September), to honour farm oxen for their service. On this day the oxen are decorated by their owners and taken around the village in a parade. The festival is popular in rural areas of Maharashtra and other Southern Indian States.
- Hartalika: The third day of the month of Bhadrapada (usually around August/September) is celebrated as Hartalika in honour of Harita Gauri or the green and golden goddess of harvests and prosperity. A lavishly decorated form of Parvati, Gauri is venerated as the mother of Ganesha. Women fast on this day and worship Shiva and Parvati in the evening with green leaves. Women wear green bangles and green clothes and stay awake till midnight. Both married and unmarried women may observe this fast.

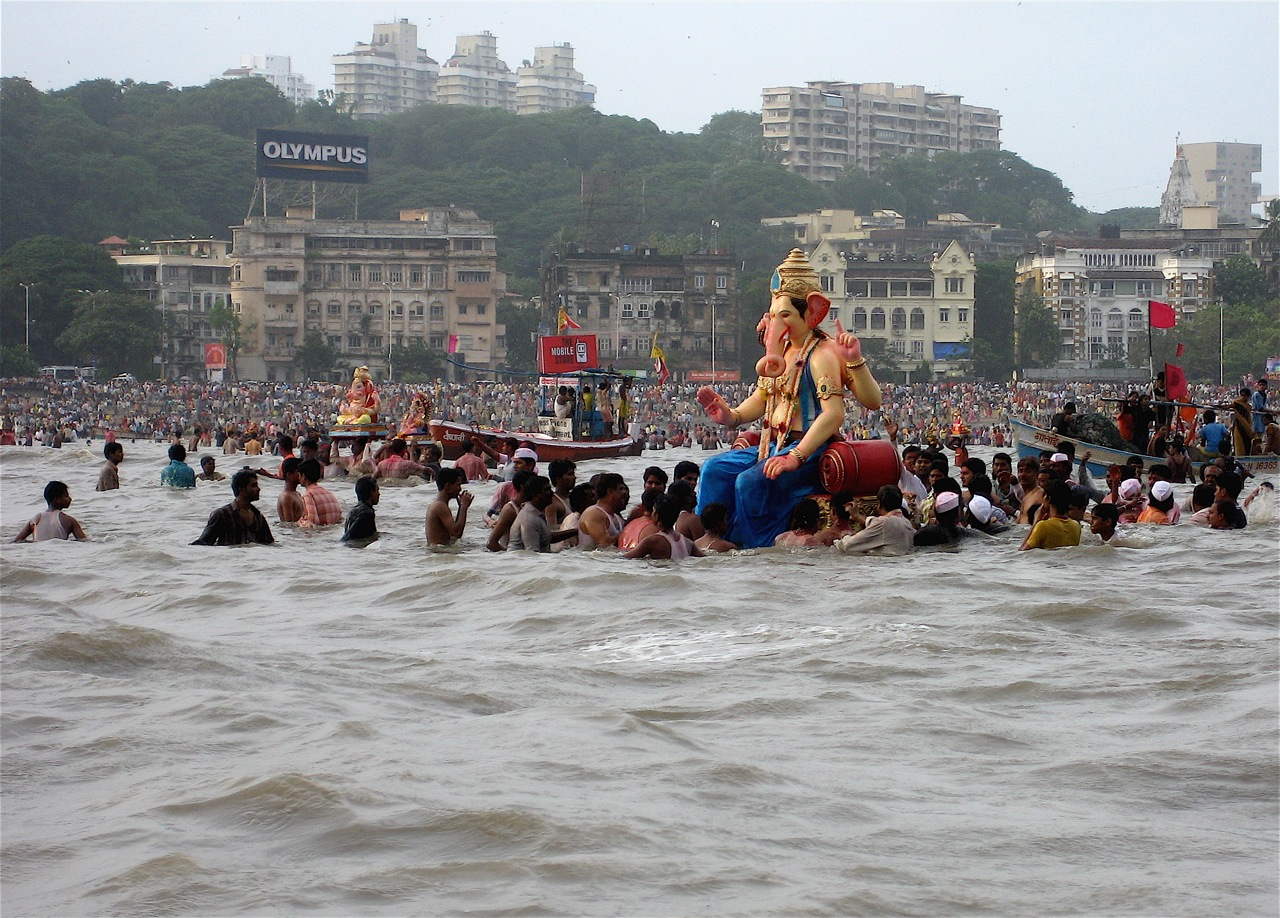
A clay idol of Ganesh being immersed in water at the conclusion of the annual Ganeshotsav on the 11th day or Anant Chaturdashi

- Ganeshotsav: This 11-day festival starts on Ganesh Chaturthi on the fourth day of Bhadrapada in honour of Ganesha, the God of wisdom. Hindu households install in their house, Ganesha idols made out of clay called shadu and painted in watercolours. Early in the morning on this day, the clay idols of Ganesha are brought home while chanting Ganpati Bappa Morya and installed on decorated platforms. The idol is worshiped in the morning and evening with offerings of flowers, durva (strands of young grass), karanji and modaks. The worship ends with the singing of an aarti in honour of Ganesha, other gods and saints. The worship includes singing the aarti 'Sukhakarta Dukhaharta', composed by the 17th-century saint Samarth Ramdas. Family traditions differ about when to end the celebration. Domestic celebrations end after 1 1/2, 3, 5, 7 or 11 days. At that time the idol is ceremoniously brought to a body of water (such as a lake, river or the sea) for immersion. In Maharashtra, Ganeshotsav also incorporates other festivals, namely Hartalika and the Gauri festival, the former is observed with a fast by women on the day before Ganesh Chaturthi, while the latter by the installation of idols of Gauris. In 1894, Nationalist leader Lokmanya Tilak turned this festival into a public event as a means of uniting people toward the common goal of campaigning against British colonial rule. The public festival lasts for 11 days with various cultural programmes including music concerts, orchestra, plays, and skits. Some social activities are also undertaken during this period like blood donation, scholarships for the needy, or donations to people suffering from any kind of natural calamity. Due to environmental concerns, a number of families now avoid bodies of water, and let the clay statue disintegrate in a barrel of water at home. After a few days, the clay is spread in the home garden. In some cities, a public, eco-friendly process is used for the immersion.
- Gauri/Mahalakshmi: Along with Ganesha, Gauri (also known as Mahalaxmi in the Vidharbha region of Maharashtra) festival is celebrated in Maharashtra. On the first day of the three-day festival, Gauris arrive home, the next day they eat lunch with a variety of sweets, and on the third day, they return to their home. Gauris arrive in a pair, one as Jyeshta (the Elder one) and another as Kanishta (the Younger one). They are treated with love since they represent the daughters arriving at their parents' home. In many parts of Maharashtra including Marathwada and Vidarbha, this festival is called Mahalakshmi or Mahalakshmya or simply Lakshmya.
- Anant Chaturdashi: The 11th day of the Ganesh festival (14th day of the month of Bhadrapada) is celebrated as Anant Chaturdashi, which marks the end of the celebration. People bid a tearful farewell to the God by immersing the installed idols from home/public places in water and chanting 'Ganapati Bappa Morya, pudhchya warshi Lawakar ya!!' ('Ganesha, come early next year.') Some people also keep the traditional wow (Vrata) of Ananta Pooja. This involves the worship of Ananta the coiled snake or Shesha on which Vishnu resides. A delicious mixture of 14 vegetables is prepared as naivedyam on this day.
- Navaratri and Ghatasthapana: Starting with the first day of the month of Ashvin in the Hindu calendar (around the month of October), the nine-day and -night festival immediately preceding the most important festival Dasara is celebrated all over India with different traditions. In Maharashtra, on the first day of this 10-day festival, idols of the Goddess Durga are ritually installed at many homes. This installation of the Goddess is popularly known as Ghatasthapana.

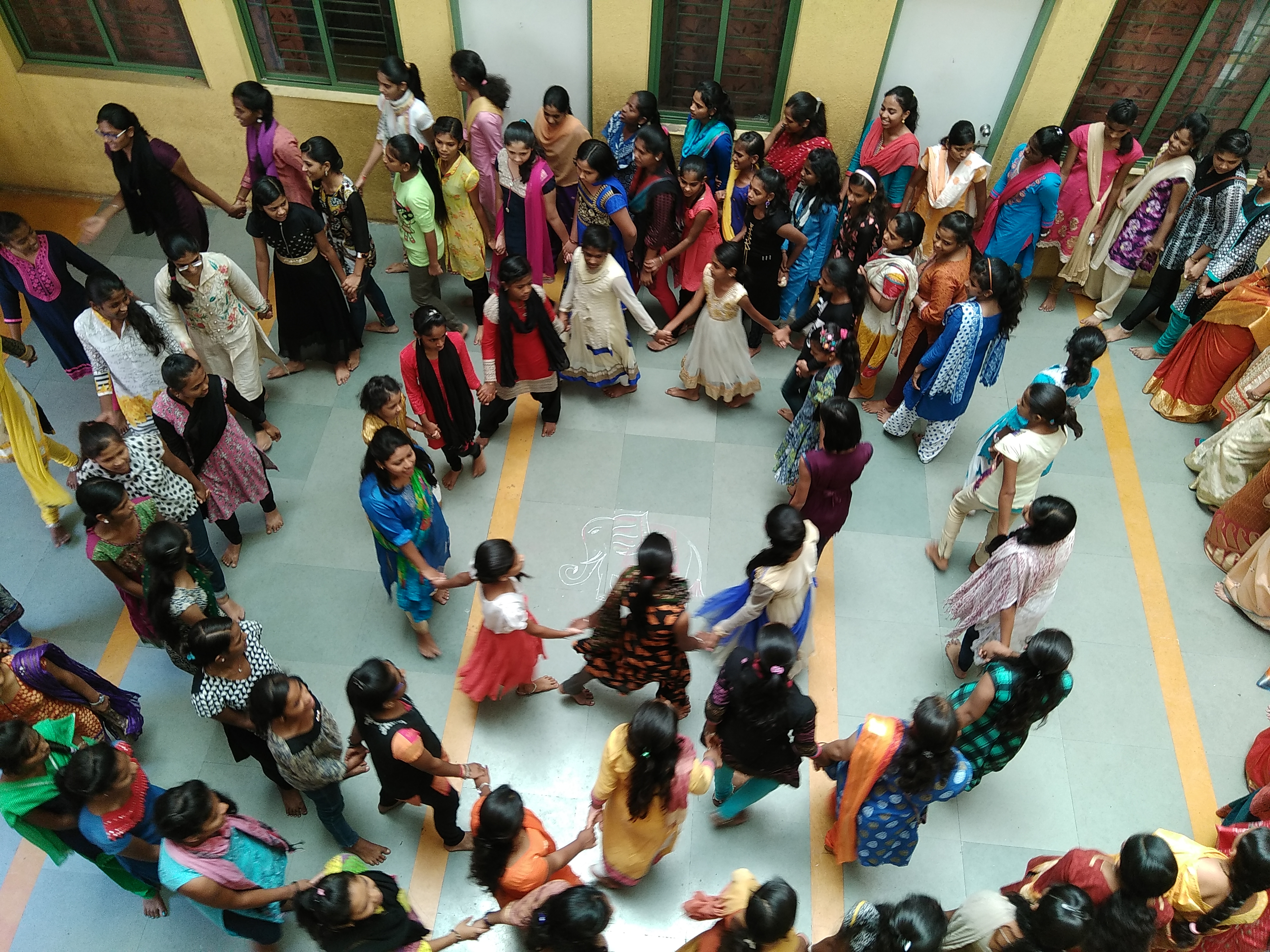
Women performing Bhondla dance during the festival of Navratri

During this Navavatri, girls and women perform 'Bhondla/Hadga' as the Sun moves to the thirteenth constellation of the zodiac called 'Hasta' (Elephant). During the nine days, Bhondla (also known as 'Bhulabai' in the Vidarbha region of Maharashtra) is celebrated in the garden or on the terrace during evening hours by inviting female friends of the daughter in the house. An elephant is drawn either with Rangoli on the soil or with a chalk on a slate and kept in the middle. The girls go around it in a circle, holding each other's hands and singing Bhondla songs. All Bhondla songs are traditional songs passed down through the generations. The last song typically ends with the words '...khirapatila kaay ga?' ('What is the special dish today?'). This 'Khirapat' is a special dish, or dishes, often made laboriously by the mother of the host girl. The food is served only after the rest of the girls have correctly guessed what the covered dish or dishes are. There are some variations with how the Navratri festival is celebrated. For example, in many Brahmin families, celebrations include offering lunch for nine days to a specially invited a group of guests. The guests include a married Woman (Marathi:सवाष्ण ), a Brahmin and, a Virgin (Marathi:कुमारिका). In the morning and evening, the head of the family ritually worships either the goddess Durga, Lakshmi or Saraswati. On the eighth day, a special rite is carried out in some families. A statue of the goddess Mahalakshmi, with the face of a rice mask, is prepared and worshiped by newly married girls. In the evening of that day, women blow into earthen or metallic pots as a form of worship to please the goddess. Everyone in the family accompanies them by chanting verses and Bhajans. The nine-day festival ends with a Yadna or reading of a Hindu Holy book (Marathi:पारायण ).

- Dasara: This festival is celebrated on the tenth day of the Ashvin month (around October) according to the Hindu Calendar. This is one of the three-and-a-half most auspicious days in the Hindu Lunar calendar when every moment is important. On the last day (Dasara day), the idols installed on the first day of the Navaratri are immersed in water. This day also marks the victory of Rama over Ravana. People visit each other and exchange sweets. On this day, people worship the Aapta tree and exchange its leaves (known as golden leaves) and wish each other a future like gold. There is a legend involving Raghuraja, an ancestor of Rama, the Aapta tree and Kuber. There is also another legend about the Shami tree where the Pandava hid their weapons during their exile.
- Kojagari Pournima: Written in the short form of Sanskrit as 'Ko Jagarti (को जागरति) ?' ( Sandhi of 'कः जागरति,' meaning 'Who is awake?'), Kojagiri is celebrated on the full moon day of the month of Ashwin. It is said that on this Kojagiri night, the Goddess Lakshmi visits every house asking 'Ko Jagarti?' and blesses those who are awake with fortune and prosperity. To welcome the Goddess, houses, temples, streets, etc. are illuminated. People get together on this night, usually in open spaces (e.g. in gardens or on terraces), and play games until midnight. At that hour, after seeing the reflection of the full moon in milk boiled with saffron and various varieties of dry fruits, they drink the concoction. The eldest child in the household is honoured on this day.
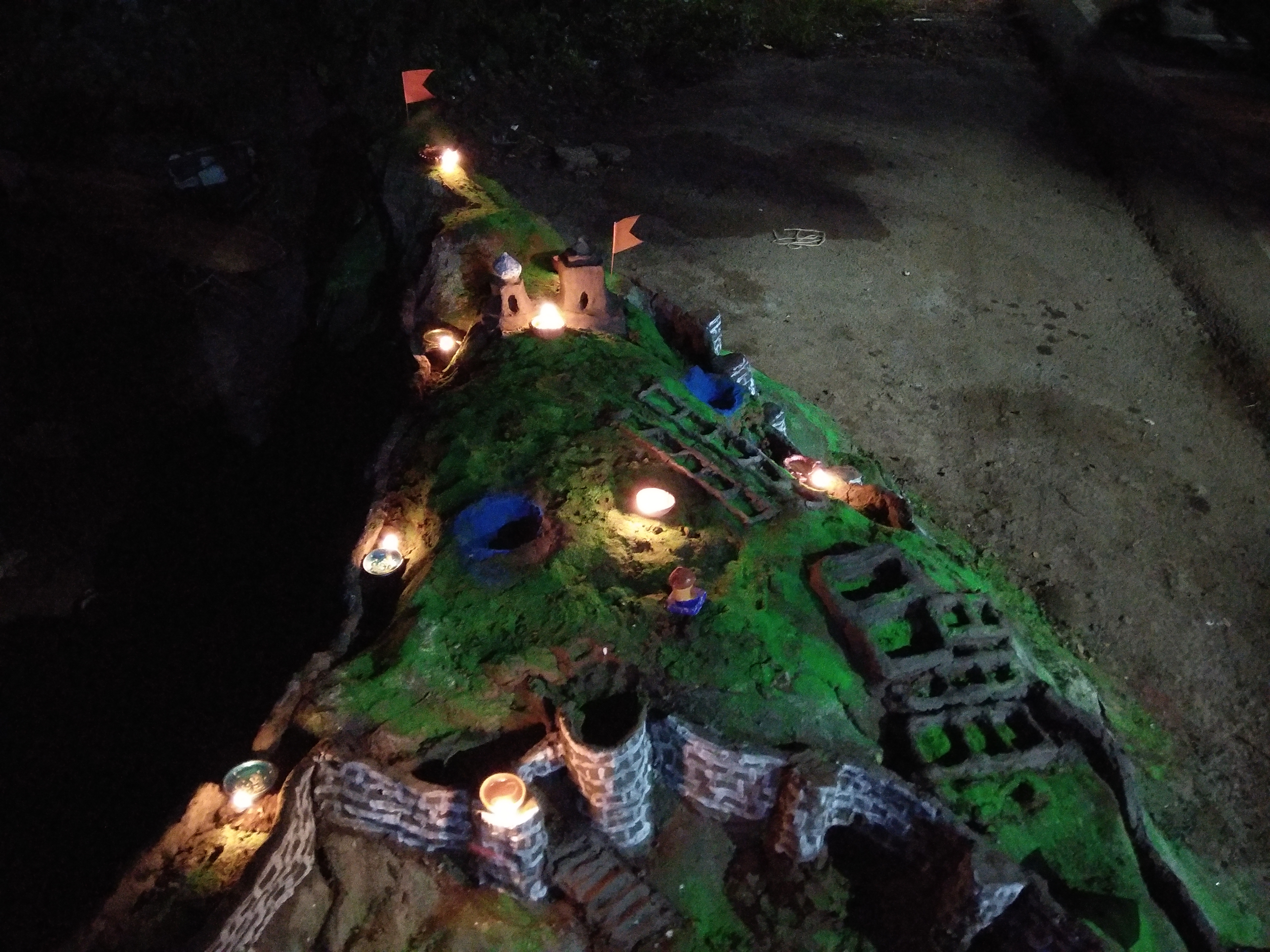
  A replica fort made by children during Diwali
- Diwali: Just like most other parts of India, Diwali, a four to five day-long festival, is one of the most popular Hindu festivals. Houses are illuminated for the festival with rows of clay lamps known as panati and decorated with rangoli and aakash kandils (decorative lanterns of different shapes and sizes). Diwali is celebrated with new clothes, firecrackers and a variety of sweets in the company of family and friends. In Marathi tradition, during days of Diwali, family members have a ritual bath before dawn and then sit down for a breakfast of fried sweets and savoury snacks. These sweets and snacks are offered to visitors to the house during the multi-day festival and exchanged with neighbours. Typical sweet preparations include Ladu, Anarse, Shankarpali, and Karanjya. Popular savoury treats include chakli, shev, and chivada. Being high in fat and low in moisture, these snacks can be stored at room temperature for many weeks without spoiling.
- Kartiki Ekadashi and Tulshicha Lagna: The 11th day of the month of Kartik marks the end of Chaturmas and is called Kartiki Ekadashi (also known as Prabodhini Ekadashi). On this day, Hindus, particularly the followers of Vishnu, celebrate his awakening after a Yoganidra of four months of Chaturmas. People worship him and fast for the entire day. The same evening, or the evening of the next day, is marked by Tulshi Vivah or Tulshicha Lagna. The Tulsi (Holy Basil plant) is held sacred by the Hindus as it is regarded as an incarnation of Mahalaxmi who was born as Vrinda. The end of Diwali celebrations mark the beginning of Tulshicha Lagna. Marathis organise the marriage of a sacred Tulshi plant in their house with Krishna. On this day the Tulshi vrundavan is coloured and decorated as a bride. Sugarcane and branches of tamarind and amla trees are planted along with the tulsi plant. Though a mock marriage, all the ceremonies of an actual Maharashtrian marriage are conducted including chanting of mantras, Mangal Ashtaka and tying of Mangal Sutra to the Tulshi. Families and friends gather for this marriage ceremony, which usually takes place in the late evening. Various pohe dishes are offered to Krishna and then distributed among family members and friends. This also marks the beginning of marriage season.

The celebration lasts for three days and ends on Kartiki Pournima or Tripurari Pournima.

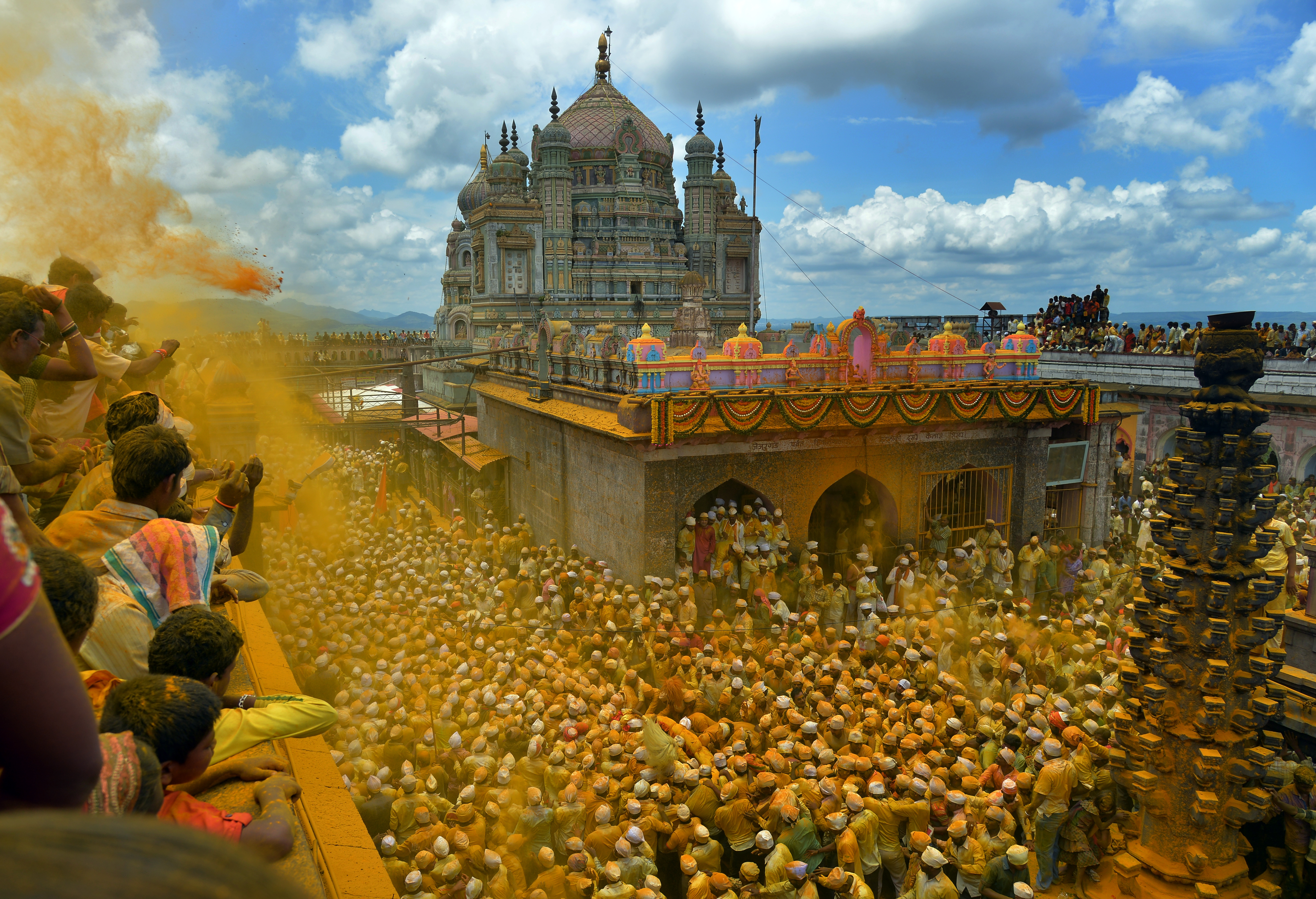
Devotees showering turmeric powder (bhandara) on each other at Khandoba Temple in Jejuri during Champa Shashthi.

- Khandoba Festival/Champa Shashthi: This is a six-day festival, from the first to the sixth lunar day of the bright fortnight of the Hindu month of Margashirsha. It is celebrated in honour of Khandoba by many Marathi families. Ghatasthapana, similar to Navaratri, also takes place in households during this festival. A number of families also hold fast during this period. The fast ends on the sixth day of the festival called Champa Shashthi. Among some Marathi Hindu communities, the Chaturmas period ends on Champa Sashthi. As it is customary in these communities not to consume onions, garlic, and egg plant (Brinjal / Aubergine) during the Chaturmas, the consumption of these food items resumes with ritual preparation of Bharit (Baingan Bharta) and rodga, small round flat bread prepared from jwari (white millet).
- Darshvel Amavasya: It is last day of the Hindu month Pausha. This festival is mostly celebrated in Marathwada region, especially in Latur, Osmanabad, Beed, Nanded and Bidar districts. Special for farmers, people get to their farms and invite friends and relatives their. Place deity (Sthan daivata) is worshipped on occasion. Alum powder is applied to five stones representing five Pandavas. They are covered with hut of grass and pink cloth (shalu) is tied to hut. Farmer pours buttermilk around the deity idol and all over the field praying "ol ghe ol ghe saalam pol ge" (meaning be wet and let the year be wealthy till next Darshvel Amavasya).
- Bhogi: The eve of the Hindu festival 'Makar Sankranti' and the day before is called Bhogi. Bhogi is a festival of happiness and enjoyment and generally takes place on 13 January. It is celebrated in honour of Indra, 'the God of Clouds and Rains'. Indra is worshiped for the abundance of the harvest, which brings plenty and prosperity to the land. Since it is held in the winter, the main food for Bhogi is mixed vegetable curry made with carrots, lima beans, green capsicums, drumsticks, green beans and peas. Bajra roti (i.e. roti made of pearl millet) topped with sesame as well as rice and moog dal khichadi are eaten to keep warm in winter. During this festival people also take baths with sesame seeds.

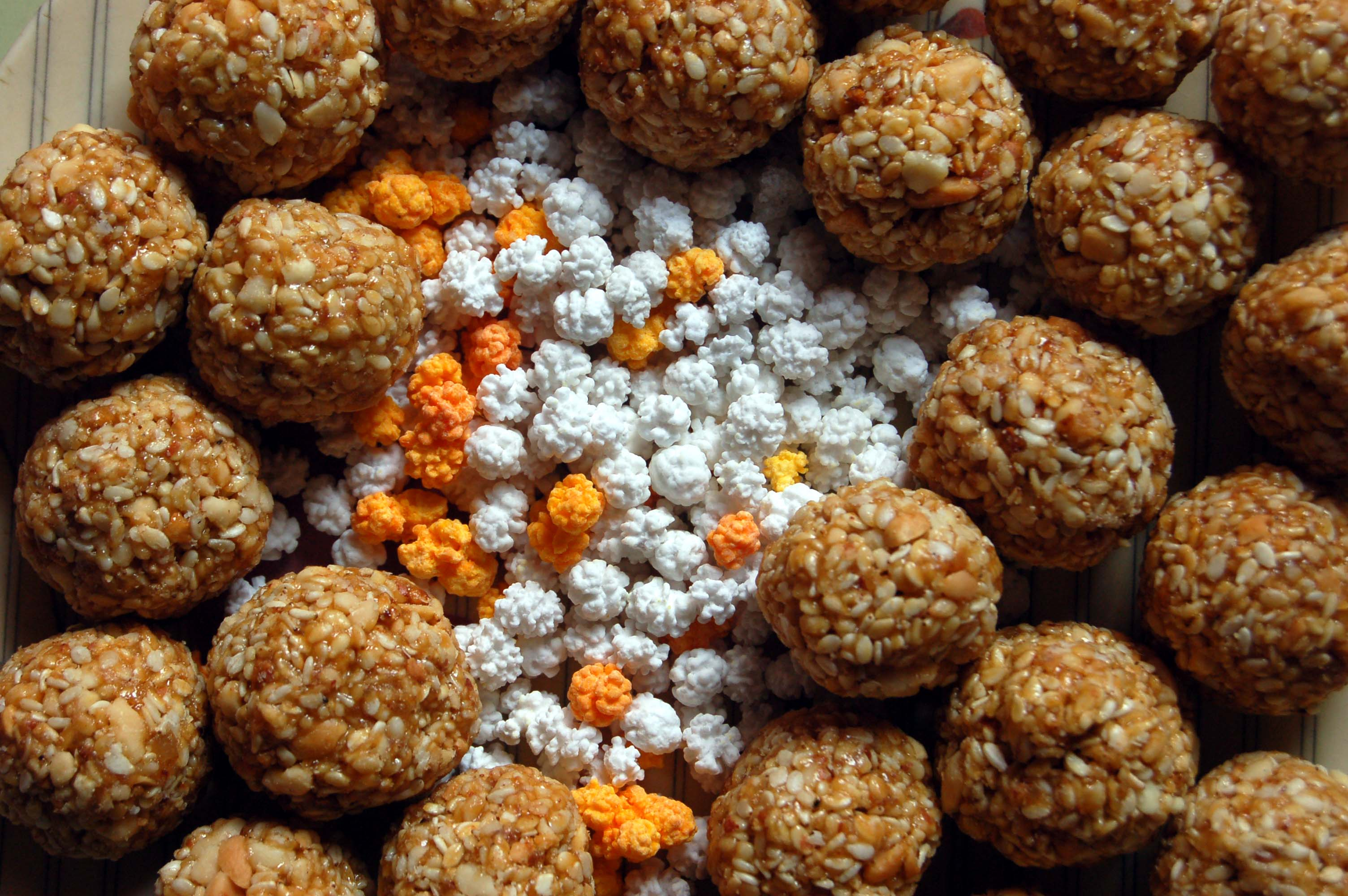
Traditional Sesame seed based sweets for Makar Sankrant

- Makar Sankranti: Sankraman means the passing of the sun from one zodiac sign to the next. This day marks the sun's passage from the Tropic of Dhanu (Sagittarius) to Makar (Capricorn). Makar Sankranti falls on 14 January in non-leap years and on 15 January in leap years. It is the only Hindu festival that is based on the solar calendar rather than the Lunar calendar. Maharashtrians exchange tilgul or sweets made of jaggery and sesame seeds along with the customary salutation, Tilgul ghya aani god bola, which means 'Accept the Tilgul and be friendly'. Tilgul Poli or gulpoli are the main sweet preparations made on the day in Maharashtra. It is a wheat-based flatbread filled with sesame seeds and jaggery.,
- Maha Shivratri: Maha Shivratri (also known as Shivaratri) means 'Great Night of Shiva' or 'Night of Shiva'. It is a Hindu festival celebrated every year on the 13th night and 14th day of Krishna Paksha (waning moon) of the month of Maagha (as per Shalivahana or Gujarati Vikrama) or Phalguna (as per Vikrama) in the Hindu Calendar, that is, the night before and day of the new moon. The festival is principally celebrated by offerings of bael (bilva) leaves to Shiva, all day fasting, and an all-night long vigil. The fasting food on this day includes chutney prepared with the pulp of the kavath fruit (Limonia).

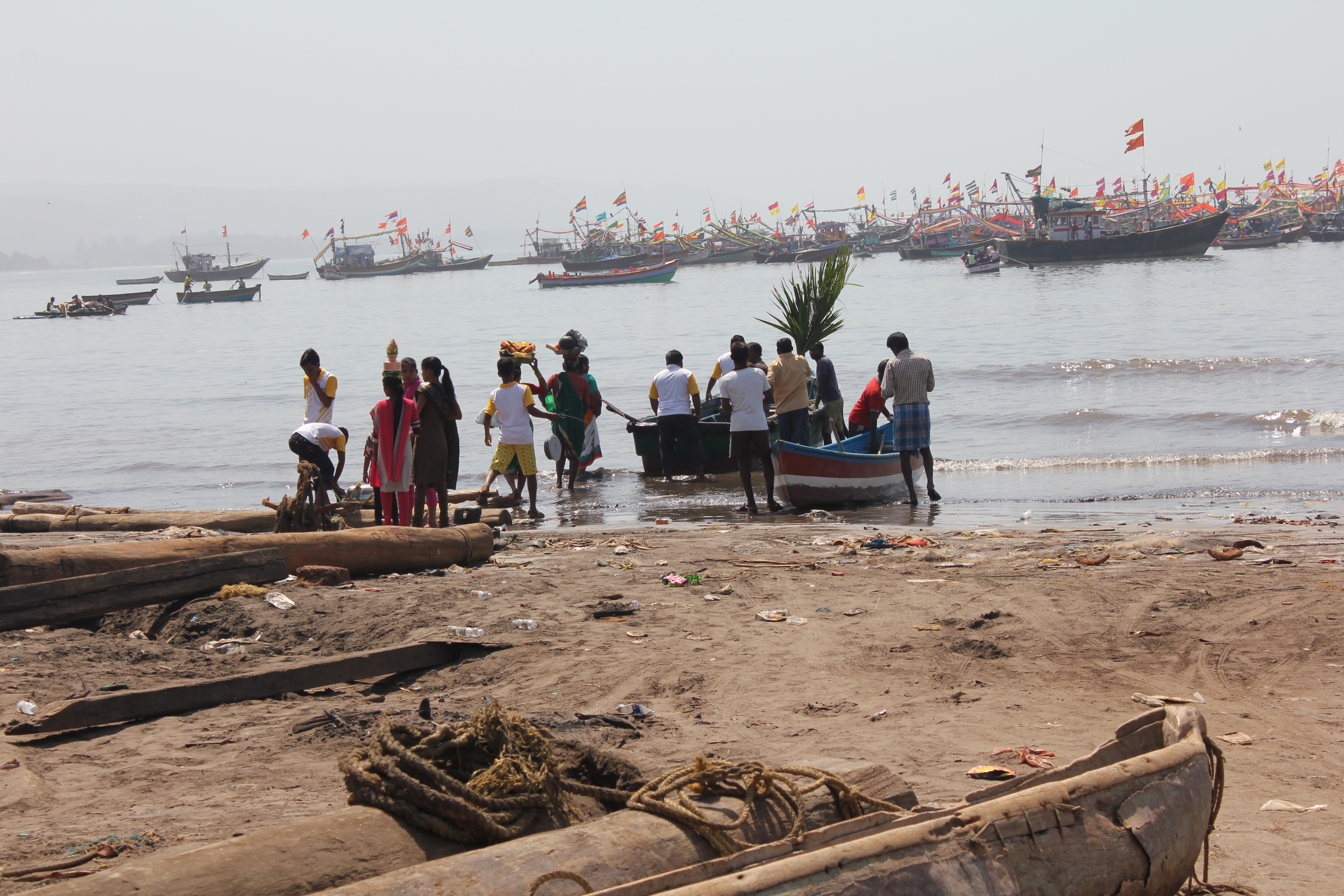
Shimga being celebrated on the port of Harne on the Konkan coast

- Holi, Shimga and Rangapanchami: The festival of Holi falls in Falgun, the last month of the Marathi Shaka calendar. Marathi people celebrate this festival by lighting a bonfire and offering puran poli to the fire. In North India, Holi is celebrated over two days with the second day celebrated with throwing colours. In Maharashtra it is known as Dhuli Vandan. However, Maharashtrians celebrate colour throwing five days after Holi on Rangapanchami. In Maharashtra, people make puran poli as the ritual offering to the holy fire.

In coastal Konkan area, the festival of Shimga is celebrated which not only incorporates Holi but also involves other rituals and celebrations which precede Holi and extends for a few days more.

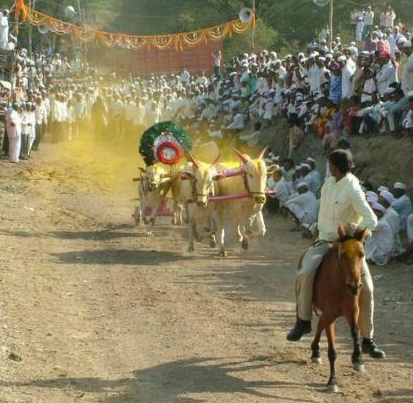
Bullock cart race at a Jatra in Manchar, Maharashtra

- Village Urus or Jatra: A large number of villages in Maharashtra hold their annual festivals (village carnivals) or urus in the months of January–May. These may be in the honour of the village Hindu deity (Gram daivat) or the tomb (dargah) of a local Sufi Pir saint. Apart from religious observations, celebrations may include bullock-cart racing, kabaddi, wrestling tournaments, a fair and entertainment such as a lavani/tamasha show by travelling dance troupes. A number of families eat meat preparations only during this period. In some villages, women are given a break from cooking and other household chores by their menfolk.

=== Festivals and celebrations observed by other communities ===
==== Dhamma Chakra Pravartan Din ====
On 14 October 1956 at Nagpur, Maharashtra, India, B. R. Ambedkar embraced Buddhist religion publicly and gave Deeksha of Buddhist religion to his more than 380,000 followers. The day is celebrated as Dharmacakra Pravartan Din. The grounds in Nagpur on which the conversion ceremony took place is known as Deekshabhoomi. Every year more than a million Buddhist people, especially Ambedkarite, from all over the world visit Deekshabhoomi to commemorate Dhamma Chakra Pravartan Din.

==== Buddha Purnima ====
Festival commemorates Lord Buddha's enlightenment and birth. Buddhist community celebrates this day with great fervor and zeal across the world. Maharashtra has India's largest Buddhist population, about 5.8% of the State's total population. The State not only has rich Buddhist heritage and culture, it is also dotted with large and small Buddhist caves. Buddhists go to common Viharas to observe a rather longer-than-usual, full-length Buddhist sutra, akin to a service. The dress code is pure white. Non-vegetarian food is normally avoided. Kheer, sweet rice porridge is commonly served to recall the story of Sujata, who offered the Buddha a bowl of milk porridge.

==== Christmas ====
Christmas (Marathi : नाताळ) is celebrated to mark the birthday of Jesus Christ. Like in other parts of India, Christmas is celebrated with zeal by the indigenous Marathi Catholics such as the Bombay East Indians & Korlai Portuguese Creole Luso-Indians.

=== Names ===
Marathi Hindu people follow a partially Patronymic naming system. For example, it is customary to associate the father's name with the given name. In the case of married women, the husband's name is associated with the given name. Therefore, the constituents of a Marathi name as given name /first name, father/husband, family name /surname. For example:

- Mahadeo Govind Ranade: Here Mahadeo is the given name, Govind is his father's given name, and Ranade is the surname.
- Jyotsna Mukund Khandekar: Here Jyotsna is the given name, Mukund is the husband's given name, and Khandekar is the surname of the husband.

==== Personal names ====
Marathi Hindus choose given names for their children from a variety of sources. They could be characters from Hindu mythological epics such as the Ramayana or Mahabharat, names of holy rivers such as Yamuna and Godavari, Hindu historical figures from Maratha or Indian history such as Shivaji and Ashoka, Marathi varkari saints such as Tukaram, Dnyaneshwar, Janabai, popular characters from modern Marathi literature, names of fragrant flowers for girls (e.g. Bakul, Kamal/Kamla for lotus), senses such as Madhura for sweetness, precious metals such female name Suwarna for gold, heavenly bodies such as the Sun and the Moon, Vasant and Sharad for spring and autumn respectively, names of film stars or sportsmen, and after virtues (e.g. Vinay for modesty). Nicknames such as Bandu, Balu, Sonya and Pillu for males and Chhabu and Bebi for girls have been popular too.

==== Surnames ====
A large number of Maharashtrian surnames are derived by adding the suffix kar to the village from which the family originally hailed. For example, Junnarkar came from town of Junnar, Waghulkar comes from the town of Waghul. According to Bhandarkar, the tradition of using place name as the surname can be traced back to the Chalukya era in the 7th century. Names like Kumbhar, Sutar, Kulkarni, Deshpande, Deshmukh, Patil, Desai, and Joshi denote the family's ancestral trade, profession, or administrative role.

Families of the historical Maratha chiefs use their clan name as their surname. Some of these are Jadhav, Bhosale, Chavan, Shinde, Shirke, More, Nimbalkar, Pawar, Masaram, Gharge-Desai (Deshmukh) and Ghatge. Members of the numerically largest Maratha Kunbi cultivator class among Marathi people have also adopted some of the Maratha clan names, either to indicate allegiance to the Maratha chief they served, or as an attempt at upward mobility.

==== Honorifics and suffixes ====
Marathi people use various suffixes and prefixes with names. Most of these are intended as honorific when addressing older people, or people with authority. The common suffixes include bai, and sometimes tai for women, rao, and saheb for men. According to Sankhelia, the first use of the word, bai was in the 13th century. In modern times, the prefixes Shree for men, and Saubhagyavati (abbreviated as Sau) for married women have become common.

=== Language and literature ===
It has been noted by scholars that there is Dravidian influence in the development of the Marathi language.

==== Ancient Marathi inscriptions ====
Marathi, also known as Seuna at that time, was the court language during the reign of the Yadava Kings. Yadava king Singhania was known for his magnanimous donations. Inscriptions recording these donations are found written in Marathi on stone slabs in the temple at Kolhapur in Maharashtra. Composition of noted works of scholars like Hemadri are also found. Hemadri was also responsible for introducing a style of architecture called Hemadpanth. Among the various stone inscriptions are those found at Akshi in the Kolaba district, which are the first known stone inscriptions in Marathi. An example found at the bottom of the statue of Gomateshwar (Bahubali) at Shravanabelagola in Karnataka bears the inscription 'Chamundraye karaviyale, Gangaraye suttale karaviyale' which gives some information regarding the sculptor of the statue and the king who ordered its creation.

==== Classical literature ====
Marathi people have a long literary tradition which started in the ancient era. It was the 13th-century saint Dnyaneshwar who produced the first treatise in Marathi on the Geeta. The work called Dnyaneshwari is considered a masterpiece. Along with Dnyaneshwar, his contemporary, Namdev was also responsible for propagating Marathi religious Bhakti literature. Namdev is also important to the Sikh tradition, since several of his compositions were included in the Sikh Holy book, the Guru Granth Sahib. Eknath, Sant Tukaram, Mukteshwar and Samarth Ramdas were equally important figures in the 17th century. In the 18th century, writers like Vaman Pandit, Raghunath Pandit, Shridhar Pandit, Mahipati, and Moropant produced some well-known works. All of the above-mentioned writers produced religious literature.

==== Modern Marathi literature ====
The first English book was translated into Marathi in 1817 while the first Marathi newspaper started in 1841. Many books on social reform were written by Baba Padamji (Yamuna Paryatana, 1857), Mahatma Jyotiba Phule, Lokhitawadi, Justice Ranade, and Hari Narayan Apte (1864–1919). Lokmanya Tilak's newspaper Kesari in Marathi was a strong voice in promoting Ganeshotsav or Chhatrapati Shivaji festival. The newspaper also offered criticism of colonial government excesses. At this time, Marathi efficiently aided by Marathi Drama. B. R. Ambedkar's newspaper, Bahishkrut Bharat, set up in 1927, provided a platform for sharing literary views.

In the mid-1950s, the 'little magazine movement' gained momentum. It published writings which were non-conformist, radical, and experimental. The Dalit literature movement also gained strength due to the little magazine movement. This radical movement was influenced by the philosophy of non-conformity, and challenged the literary establishment, which was largely middle class, urban, and upper caste. The little magazine movement was responsible for many excellent writers including the well-known novelist, critic, and poet Bhalchandra Nemade. Dalit writer N. D. Mahanor is well known for his work, while Dr. Sharad Rane is a well-known children's writer.

== Martial tradition ==
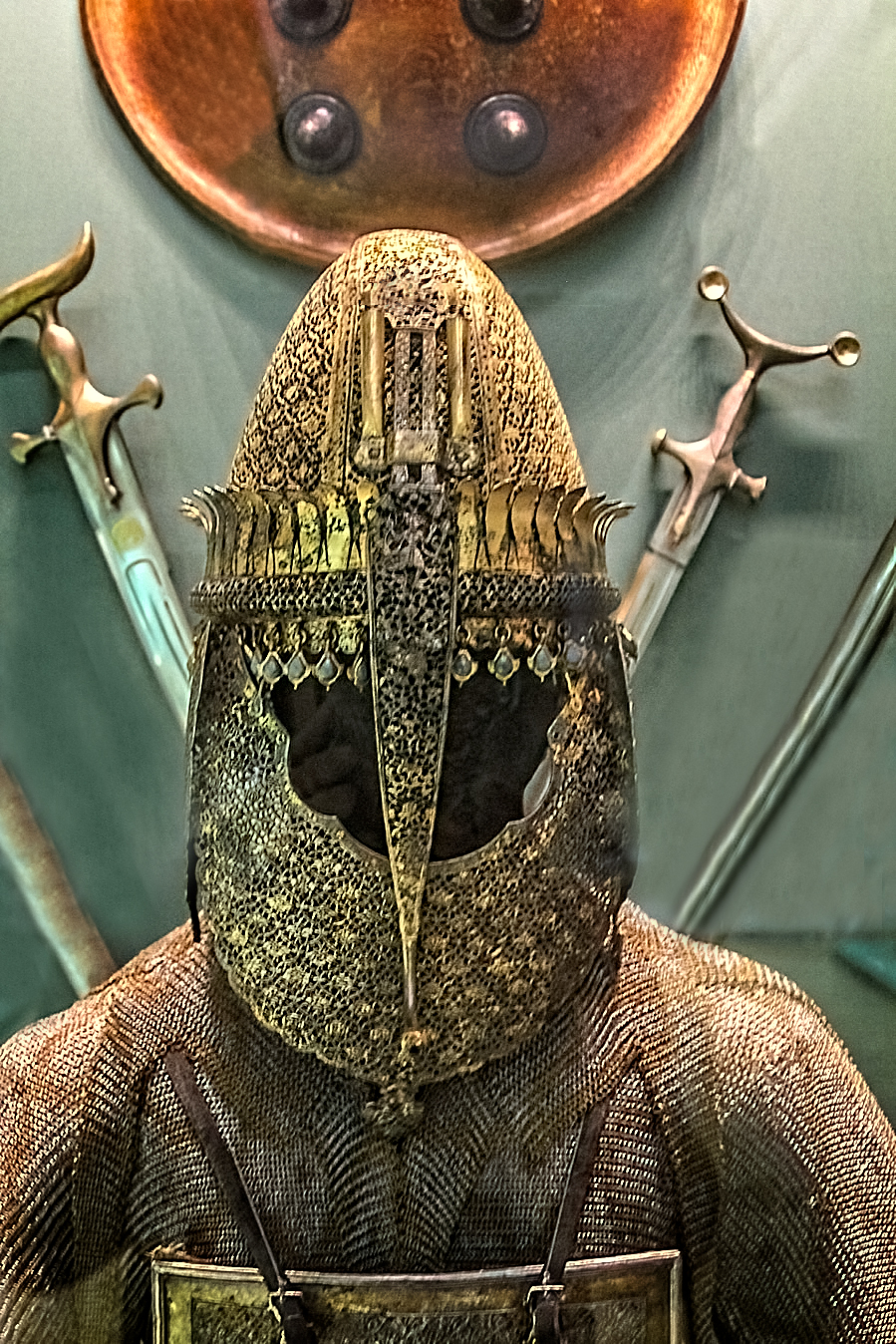
Maratha Empire Armory

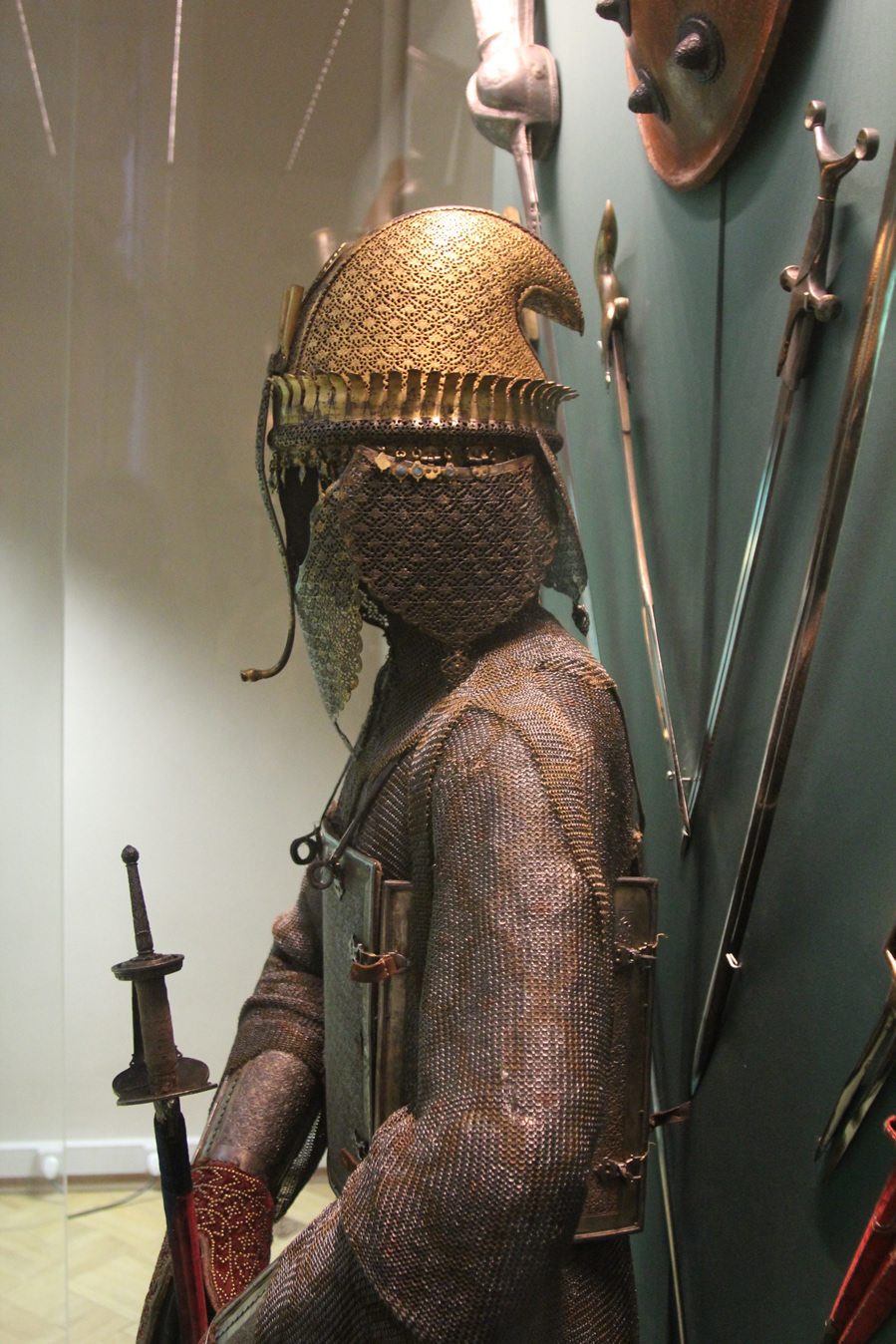
Signature Maratha Empire helmet with curved back.

Maratha Armour from Hermitage Museum, St Petersburg, Russia.

Although ethnic Marathis have taken up military roles for many centuries, their martial qualities came to prominence in 17th-century India, under the leadership of Shivaji. He founded the Maratha Empire, which at the time of the mid-18th century controlled large parts of the Indian subcontinent. It was largely an ethnic Marathi polity, with its chiefs and nobles coming from the Marathi ethnicity, such as the Bhonsles (Maratha caste), the Holkars (Dhangar caste), the Peshwas (1713 onwards; Chitpavan caste), the Angres, chief of Maratha Navy (Maratha caste; 1698 onwards). The Maratha Empire is credited to a large extent for reducing the Mughal emperor to a mere figurehead. Further, they were also considered by the British as the most important native power of 18th-century India. Today this ethnicity is represented in the Indian Army, with two regiments deriving their names from Marathi communities —the Maratha Light Infantry and the Mahar Regiment.

== See also ==
- List of Maratha dynasties and states
- Maharatta
- List of Marathi people
- Magar (Maharashtra)
- Thanjavur Marathi people
- Western Satraps
