= Mangala Ashtaka =

Hindu mantra

Maṅgala Aṣṭaka is a Hindu mantra sung at Marathi weddings. Mangala Astaka also refers to eight-line verses recited as a blessing in Poruwa, the Sinhalese Buddhist marriage ceremony.

== Hindu mantra ==
It starts with the Aṣṭavināyaka Vandana, which is as follows:

Svasti Śrī Gaṇanāyakam Gajāmukham Moreśvara Siddhidam Ballalam Murudum
Vināyaka Maham Cintamanim Thevaram / Lenyadrim Girijātmājam Suvaradam
Vighneśvara Ojhāram Grāme Ranjananamake Gaṇapatiḥ
Kūryāt Sadā Maṅgalaṃ

Other verses are added, based on the number of enthusiastic singers present in the wedding ceremony. The last verse is always:

tadeva lagnaṁ sudinaṁ tadeva tārā-balaṁ candra-balaṁ tadeva ।
vidyā-balaṁ daiva-balaṁ tadeva lakṣmīpateḥ te'ṁghriyugaṁ smarāmi ॥!

:तदेव लग्नं सुदिनं तदेव ताराबलं चंद्रबलं तदेव / :विद्या बलं दैवबलं तदेव लक्ष्मीपतेः तेऽङ्घ्रियुगं स्मरामि ॥
