= Brihan Maharashtra =

Brihan Maharashtra is an organisation supporting natives of the Indian state of Maharashtra who live elsewhere. Benefiting from its educational programme, many of its members follow service-oriented careers. The community has formed several Maharashtra Mandals to preserve its culture.

The community has Indian branches in New Delhi, Ahmedabad, Bhopal, Hyderabad, Bangalore and other cities, and overseas branches in the United States, Canada, Japan, Australia, Tanzania, Kenya, the UAE and elsewhere.
