= Savji =

Ethnic group in India

Savji (also spelt as Saoji, Souji, Sauji) is a Hindu community found in the Indian states of Maharashtra, Karnataka, and Andhra Pradesh.

== Cuisine ==
Savji food is known for its very hot and spicy flavour in many cities (where they are in large number) served in small family-style restaurants called Savji khanavali or "Savji hotel" or bhojanalaya, found in places like Nagpur in Maharashtra and Bombay Karnataka region.

== Language ==
Savji people speak a language called "Savji bhasha" or "Khatri bhasha" in some regions that belongs to the Indo-Aryan language family and appears to be an amalgamation of Indic languages such as Sanskrit, Hindi, Marathi, Sindhi, Gujarati, Kannada, and Marwari.
