= Sant Dnyaneshwaranchi Muktai =

- Theatrical release poster
- Directed by: Digpal Lanjekar
- Written by: Digpal Lanjekar
- Produced by: Reshma Kundan Thadani
- Starring: Ishmita Joshi; Manas Bedekar; Saheel Dharmadhikari; Abhir Gore
- Cinematography: Sandeep Shinde
- Edited by: Sagar Shinde; Vinay Shinde
- Music by: Avadhoot Gandhi; Devdatta Baji; Shantanu Ravindra Pande
- Production company: Dither Production
- Distributed by: AA Films
- Release date: 18 April 2025
- Country: India
- Language: Marathi

Sant Dnyaneshwaranchi Muktai is a 2025 Indian Marathi-language film based on the life of Saint Muktabai. The film is directed by Digpal Lanjekar and produced by Reshma Kundan Thadani under Dither Production, distributed by AA Films.

The film was theatrically released on 18 April 2025.

== Plot ==
Muktai's childhood and her spiritual journey is depicted in the film.

== Cast ==
- Tejas Barve as Sant Dnyaneshwar
  - Manas Badekar as young Sant Dnyaneshwar
- Neha Naik as Muktai
  - Ishmita Joshi as young Mukati
- Akshay Kelkar as Nivrutti
  - Sahil Dharmadhikari as young Nivrutti
- Suraj Parasnis as Sopan
  - Abhir Gore as young Sopan
- Sameer Dharmadhikari as Vithalpant Kulkarni
- Mrinal Kulkarni as Rukmini
- Ajay Purkar as Changdev
- Manoj Joshi as Brahmeshwar Shastri
- Sachin Deshpande as Shivshastri
- Smita Shewale as Yashoda, Shivshastri's wife
- Abhijeet Shwetchandra as Bhagwan Vitthal
- Nupur Daithankar as Devi Rukmini
- Bhushan Shivtare as Gahininath
- Adinath Kothare as Sant Namdev
- Ashwini Mahangade as Sant Janabai
- Sunil Godbole as Devkule Shastri
- Ashutosh Wadekar as Gram Joshi
- Bipin Surve as Shambhu Pandit
- Sachin Bhilare as the potter
- Neeta Donde as the potter's wife
- Pravin Tarde as Sant Chokhamela
- Dipti Dhotre as Sant Soyarabai
- Nakshatra Medhekar as Sant Kanhopatra
- Dipti Lele as Devi Saraswati
- Sunil Jadhav as Sant Gora Kumbhar
- Akshay Waghmare as Sant Narahari Sonar
- Astad Kale as Sant Savata Mali

== Production ==
The film was officially announced in October 2023. The production was wrapped up in January 2024.

== Release ==
=== Theatrical ===
The film originally slated for June 2024 was rescheduled to August 2, 2024. On 22 July 2024, the producers announced another delay due to technical issues. The release date was then set for 3 January 2025, but it was rescheduled for 18 April 2025.

=== Marketing ===
The teaser was released on 21 June 2024. The team kicked off the promotions in Alandi, the cast dressed as their saintly characters. The music launch event was held in April 2025 in Mumbai.

== Reception ==
Sant Dnyaneshwaranchi Muktai generally received positive reviews. Anub George from The Times of India rated the film 3.5 out of 5, praising Lanjekar's direction, the heartfelt storyline, and the music by Devdutta Baji and Avadhoot Gandhi, describing it as a profound spiritual experience. Santosh Bhingarde, writing for Sakal, commended the film's depiction of the four siblings’ spiritual journey and its visually captivating presentation of Maharashtra's saintly legacy. Sanjay Ghavare of Lokmat highlighted the film's ability to vividly portray Sant Muktabai's life and its inspirational quality, noting its effective representation of the saints’ teachings.
