= Muktabai =

Varkari saint

Sant Muktabai
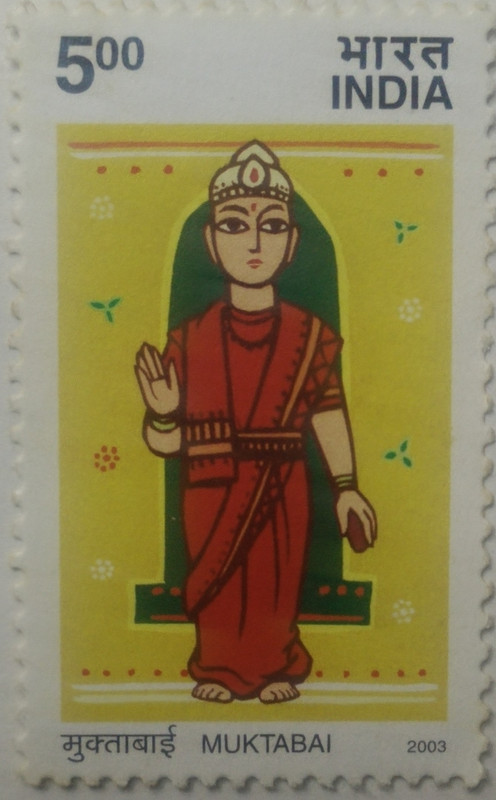
- 2003 Indian Stamp depicting Muktabai

Personal life
- Born: 1279 Alandi
- Died: 1297 (aged 17–18) Muktainagar
- Notable work(s): Abhanga poetry, Tati ughada dnaneshwara
- Honors: Sant in Marathi, meaning "Saint"

Religious life
- Religion: Hinduism
- Order: Varkari tradition
- Philosophy: Vaishnavism

Religious career
- Teacher: Dnyaneshwar
- Disciples: Changdev

Muktabai Vitthalpant Kulkarni was a saint in the Varkari Movement. She was born in a Marathi family and was the younger sister of Dnyaneshwar, the first Varkari saint. She wrote forty-one abhangs throughout her life.

== Early life ==
Muktabai's father's name was Vitthalpant Kulkarni, and her mother was Rukminibai Kulkarni. According to Nath tradition, Muktabai was the youngest of the four children born to Vitthalpant Kulkarni and his wife Rukmanibai. Her father was an orthodox accountant. Muktabai had three elder brothers named Nivruttinath, Dnyaneshwar, and Sopan.

=== Siblings of Saint Muktabai ===
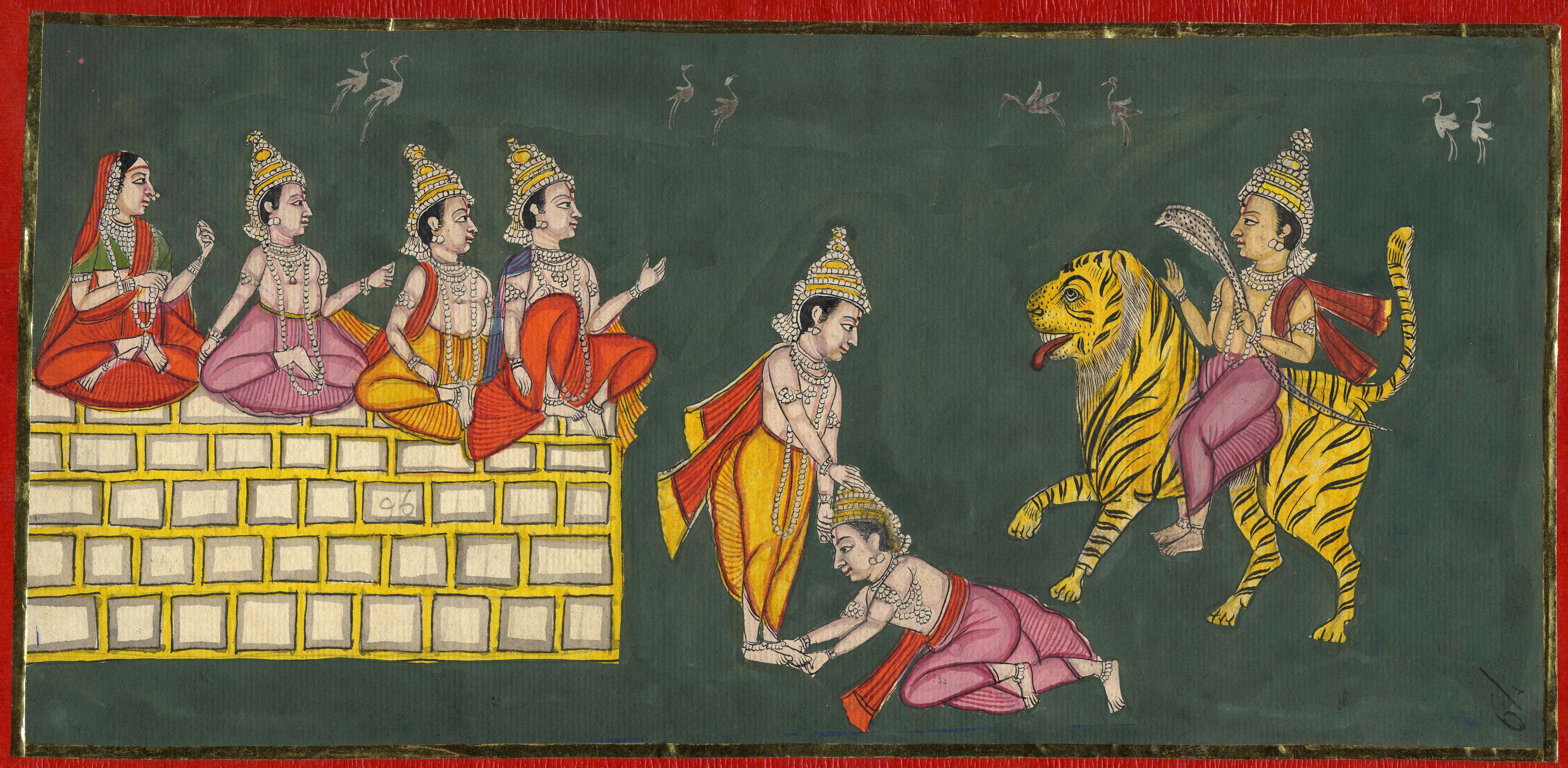
The siblings Muktabai, Sopan, Dnyaneshwar and Nivrutinath seated on the flying wall greet Changdev seated on a tiger. In the centre, Changdev bows to Dnyaneshwar.

1. Nivruttinath: The eldest brother of Muktabai, Nivrutti was an authority on the philosophy of the Nath. Gahininath, one of the nine Nath gurus, accepted Nivrutti as his disciple and initiated him into the Nath sect, instructing him to propagate devotion to Shri Krishna. Dnyaneshwar accepted his elder brother as his own guru. After the early samadhi of Dnyaneshwar, Nivrutti travelled with his sister Muktai on a pilgrimage along the Tapti River, where they were caught in a thunderstorm and Muktai was swept away. Nivrutti obtained samadhi at Tryambakeshwar. Around 375 abhangs are attributed to him but the authorship of many of them is disputed due to difference in writing style and philosophy.
2. Dnyaneshwar (1275–1296): The second of the siblings was a 13th-century Marathi sant, poet, philosopher and yogi of the Nath tradition whose Dnyaneshwari (a commentary on the Bhagavad Gita) and Amrutanubhav are considered to be milestones in Marathi literature.
3. Sopan: Her younger brother, attained samadhi at Saswad near Pune. He wrote a book, the Sopandevi based on the Marathi translation of the Bhagavad Gita along with 50 or so abhangs.

== Traditional history ==
According to Nath tradition Muktabai was the last of the four children of Vitthal Govind Kulkarni and Rukmini, a pious couple from Apegaon near Paithan on the banks of the river Godavari. Vitthal had studied the Vedas and set out on pilgrimages at a young age. In Alandi, about 30 km from Pune, Sidhopant, a local Yajurveda Brahmin, was very much impressed with him and Vitthal married his daughter Rukmini.

After some time, getting permission from Rukmini, Vitthal went to Kashi (Varanasi), where he met Ramananda Swami and requested to be initiated into sannyas, lying about his marriage. But Ramananda Swami later went to Alandi and, convinced that his student Vitthal was the husband of Rukmini, he returned to Kashi and ordered Vitthal to return home to his family. The couple was excommunicated as Vitthal had broken with sannyas, the last of the four ashrams. Four children were born to them; Nivrutti in 1273, Jñāneśvar in 1275, Sopan in 1277 and daughter Muktai in 1279. According to some scholars their birth years are 1268, 1271, 1274, 1277 respectively. It is believed that later Vitthal and Rukmini ended their lives by jumping into the waters at Prayag which is the confluence of three rivers, the Ganges, Yamuna, and the now extinct Saraswati, hoping that their children would be accepted into the society after their death.

Earlier the couple set out on a pilgrimage with their children to Tryambakeshwar, near Nashik, where their elder son Nivrutti (at the age of 10) was initiated into the Nath tradition by Gahininath. The paternal great grandfather of Dnyaneshwar had been initiated into the Nath cult by Goraksha Nath (Gorakh Nath). The orphaned children grew up on alms. They approached the Brahmin community of Paithan to accept them but the Brahmins refused. According to the disputed "Shuddhi Patra" the children were purified by the Brahmins on condition of observing celibacy. Their argument with the Brahmins earned the children fame and respect due to their righteousness, virtue, intelligence, knowledge and politeness. Dnyaneshwar became the student of Nivruttinath along with his younger siblings Sopan and Mukta at the age of 8. He learnt and mastered the philosophy and various techniques of Kundalini yoga.

=== Writings ===
- "Tatiche Abhang" (The Song of the Door) -

She says: "An ascetic is pure in mind and forgives the offences of people. If the world is hot as fire owing to exasperation, a sage should with pleasure be cool as water. If people hurt them with weapons of words, saints should treat those remarks as pieces of advice. This universe is a single piece of cloth woven with the one thread of Brahman, so please open the door, O Jnaneshwar."

- Preachings to Changdev -

She says: "Though he has no form my eyes saw him, his glory is fire in my mind that knows his secret inner form invented by the soul. What is beyond the mind has no boundary. In it our senses end. Mukta says: Words cannot hold him yet in him all words are." "Where darkness is gone I live, where I am happy. I am not troubled by coming and going, I am beyond all vision, above all spheres. His spirit lives in my soul. Mukta says: He is my heart's only home."

== Legacy ==
- In many places in Maharashtra, devotees worship Muktabai. In north Maharashtra people worship Muktai and do varis (devotional visits) to Muktai's temple. Varkari consider saint Muktai 'Adishakti', Goddess. Varkaris sing abhangas written by Muktai. They call saint Muktabai - Muktai means mother Muktabai.
- A town's name is changed from Edlabad to Muktainagar to honor saint Muktabai. This town is administrative center of Muktainagar taluka so the taluka also became Muktainagar taluka.
- Saint Muktai's abhangas are included in Marathi text books of Balbharati in Maharashtra.
- Bhagwat Katha readers mention saint Muktai with great respect.

== See also ==
- Bhakti movement
- Namdev
- Nivruttinath
- Dnyaneshwar
- Tukaram
- Eknath
- Sopan
- Chokhamela
- Sant Soyarabai
- Janabai
- Sant Mat
- Pandharpur Wari – the largest annual pilgrimage in Maharashtra that includes a ceremonial Palkhi of Tukaram and Jñāneśvar.
