= Janabai =

Indian poet and saint

Sant Janābāi was a Marāthi religious Sant and poet in the Hindu tradition in India, who was born likely in the seventh or the eighth decade of the 13th century. She died in 1350.

Janabai was born in Gangākhed 1258-1350, Mahārāshtra to a couple with first names Damā and Karund. Under the caste system the couple belonged to the matang. After her mother died, her father took her to Pandharpur. Since her childhood, Janabai worked as a maid servant in the household of Dāmāsheti, who lived in Pandharpur and who was the father of the prominent Marathi religious Sant and poet Nāmdev. Janabai was likely a little older than Namdev, and attended to him for many years.

Pandharpur has high religious significance especially among Marathi-speaking Hindus. Janabai's employers, Damasheti and his wife, Gonāi, were very religious. Through the influence of the religious environment around her and her innate inclination, Janabai was always an ardent devotee of Vithoba. She was also a talented poet. Though she never had any formal schooling, she composed many high-quality religious verses of the abhang (अभंग) form. Some of her compositions were preserved along with those of Namdev. Authorship of about 300 abhang is traditionally attributed to Janabai.

Along with Dnyāneshwar, Nāmdev, Eknāth, and Tukaram, Janabai has a revered place in the minds of Marathi-speaking Hindus who belong especially to the Varkari sect in Maharashtra.

== See also ==
- Backward-caste Hindu Saints
- Wārakari
- Women in Hinduism
- Bhakti movement
- Namdev
- Nivruttinath
- Dnyaneshwar
- Tukaram
- Eknath
- Sopan
- Muktabai
- Chokhamela
- Sant Soyarabai
- Gadge Maharaj
- Sant Mat
- Pandharpur Wari – the largest annual pilgrimage in Maharashtra that includes a ceremonial Palkhi of Tukaram and Jñāneśvar.
