= Sopan =

Hindu saint

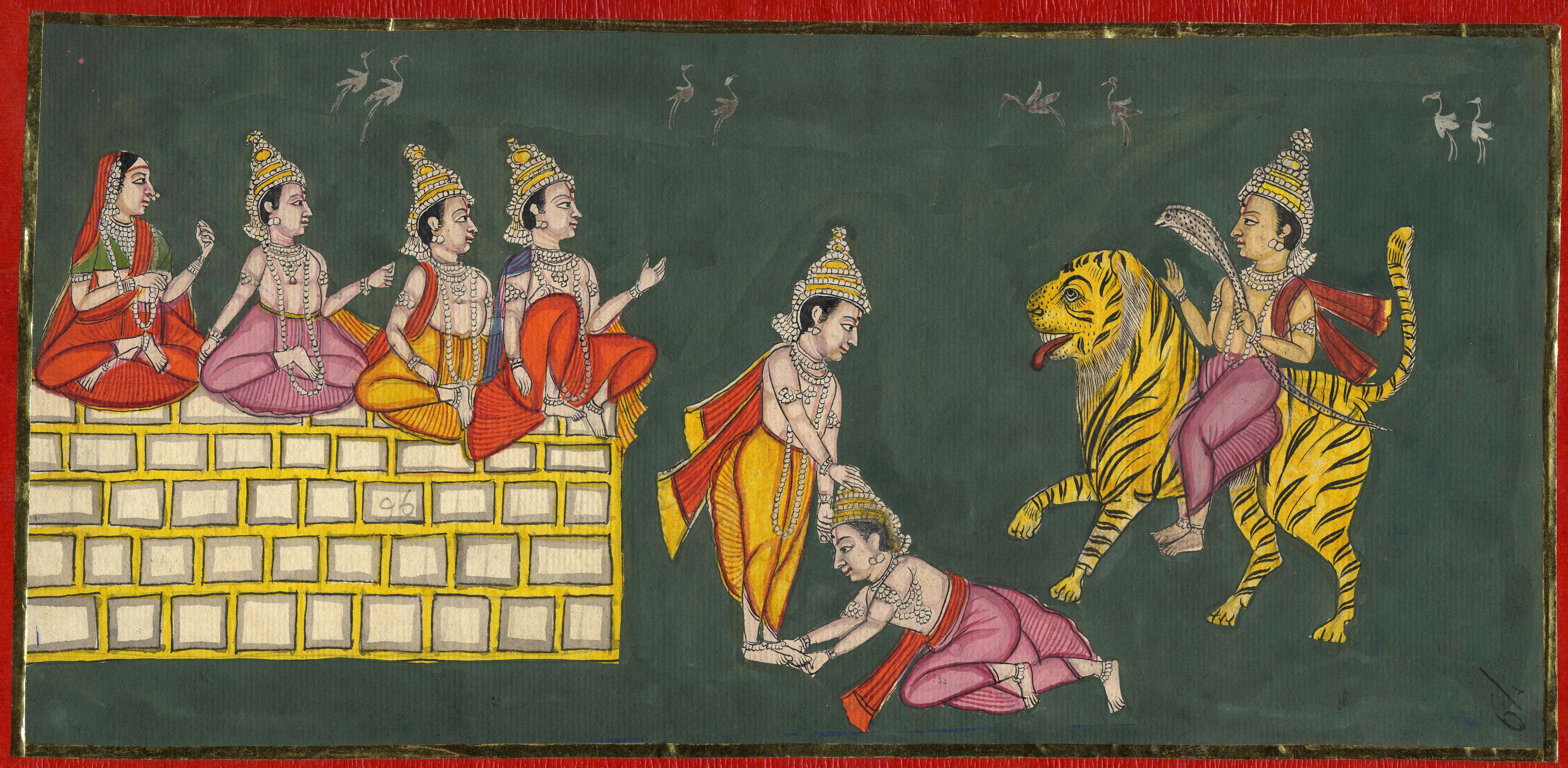
The siblings Muktabai, Sopan, Jñāneśvar and Nivruttinath seated on the flying wall greet Changdev Maharaj seated on a tiger. In the centre, Changdev bows to Jñāneśvar.

Sant Sopandeo was a sant of the Varkari and also the younger brother of Dnyaneshwar.

Sopan (19 November 1277 - 29 December 1296), attained samadhi at Saswad near Pune. He wrote a book, the Sopandevi based on the Marathi translation of the Bhagavad Gita along with 50 or so abhangs.

== Siblings ==
1. Nivruttinath: The eldest brother of Sopan, Nivrutti was an authority on the philosophy of the Nath. Gahininath, one of the nine Nath gurus, accepted Nivrutti as his disciple and initiated him into the Nath sect, instructing him to propagate devotion to Shri Krishna. Dnyaneshwar accepted his elder brother as his own guru. After the early samadhi of Dnyaneshwar, Nivrutti travelled with his sister Muktai on a pilgrimage along the Tapti River, where they were caught in a thunderstorm and Muktai was swept away. Nivrutti obtained samadhi at Tryambakeshwar. Around 375 abhangs are attributed to him but the authorship of many of them is disputed due to the difference in writing style and philosophy.
1. Dnyaneshwar (1275–1296): The second of the siblings was a 13th-century Marathi sant, poet, philosopher and yogi of the Nath tradition whose Jñānēśvarī (a commentary on the Bhagavad Gita) and Amrutanubhav are considered to be milestones in Marathi literature.
1. Muktabai: His younger sister, Muktabai wrote forty-one abhangs throughout her lifespan.
