= Nivruttinath =

Varkari saint

Sant Nivruttinath

Personal life
- Born: 11 February 1273 Apegaon, Yadava dynasty (present day in Aurangabad district, Maharashtra, India)
- Died: 24 June 1297 (aged 24) Sanjeevan Samadhi Trimbakeshwar
- Known for: Guru of Saint Dnyaneshwar
- Honors: Sant (Saint)

Religious life
- Religion: Hinduism
- Order: Vaishnavism, Nath
- Philosophy: Advaita vedanta, Varkari, Hinduism

Religious career
- Teacher: Gahaninath (NathPhilosophy)
- Disciples: Sant Dnyaneshwar (younger brother)

Nivrutti Vitthalpant Kulkarni (Marathi : निवृत्तिनाथ) (c. 11 February 1273 – 24 June 1297) was a 13th-century Marathi Bhakti saint, poet, philosopher and yogi of the Nath tradition. He was the elder brother and the mentor (guru) of Dnyaneshwar, the Varkari saint.

== Family and early life ==
Nivruttinath was born in Apegaon village on the bank of Godavari river near Paithan in Maharashtra into a Marathi family during the reign of the Yadava King Ramadevarava.

Nivruttinath was one of the four children, and the eldest son, of Vitthalpant, a kulkarni (hereditary accountant), and Rakhumabai. Vitthalpant did atonement for the acceptance of his children in society. Vitthal Pant and his wife were suggested to give up their life to get rid of the ex-communication as Vitthal Panth was believed to be a sannyasin but after the birth of his children, Brahmins of the day saw a renunciate returning to his life as a householder as heresy and Nivruttinath and his siblings were denied the right to have in society.

Vitthal Pant and his wife gave up their lives, within a year by jumping into the Indrayani River, leaving their child behind. after that nivrutti had to look after his siblings. Being creative poet and philosopher, Nivrutti suggested his younger brother Dnyaneshwar to translate Geeta which was written in Sanskrit into Marathi language in order to get the people know easily. He offered Dnyaneshwar his entire spiritual wealth and achievement.

== Nath Tradition ==
At around the age of 10, Nivruttinath's family moved to Nashik. During a pilgrimage trip, Vitthalapant along with his family was confronted by a tiger. The family escaped while Nivruttinath got separated from the family. He hid in a cave on the Anjani mountain where he met Gahaninath, who initiated Nivruttinath into the wisdom of the Nath tradition.

== Dnyaneshwar as disciple ==
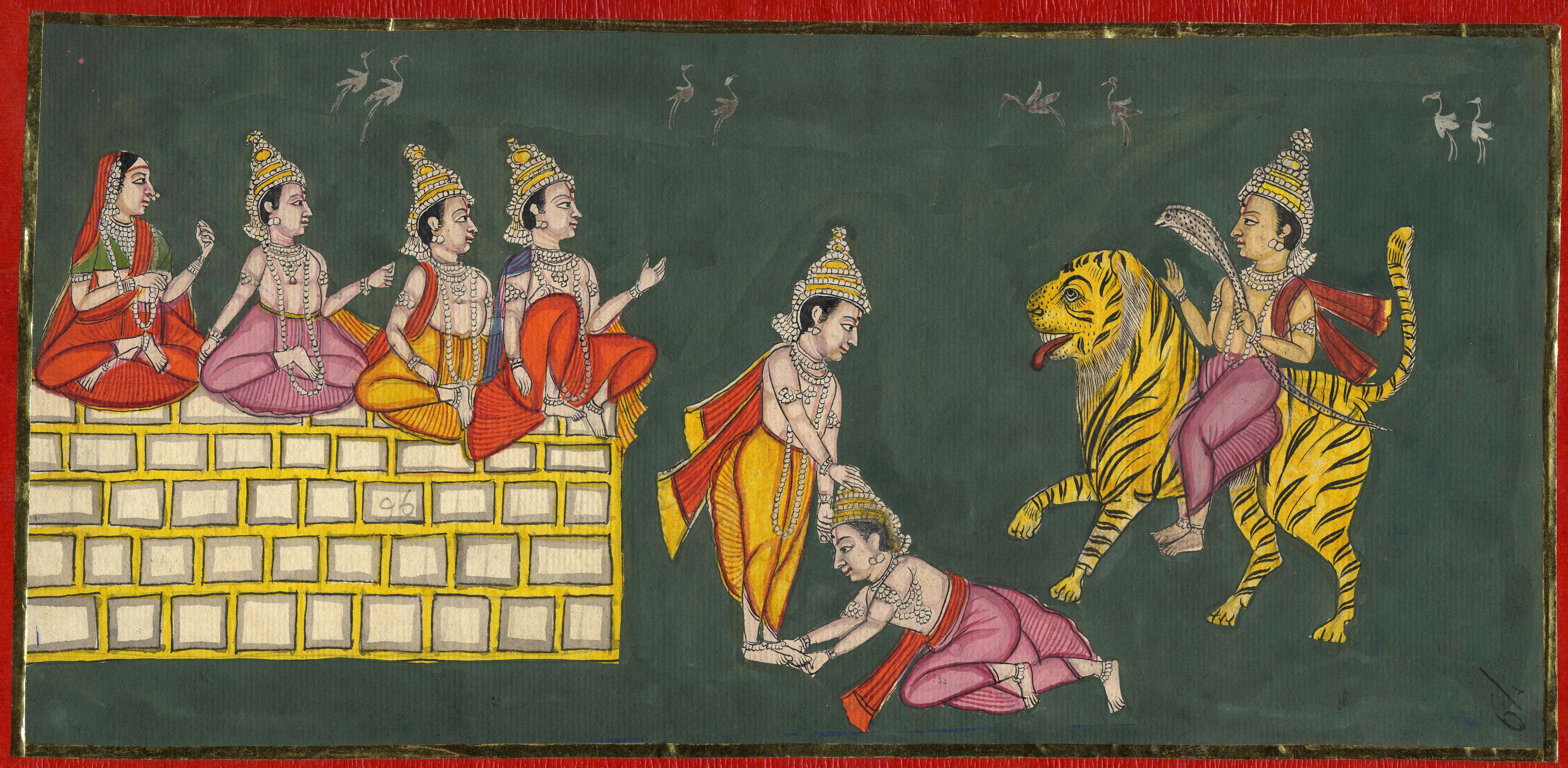

The Natha Tradition is an initiatory Guru–shishya tradition. After the death of their parents, Nivruttinath initiated Dnyaneshwar into the Nath tradition and become his teacher (Guru).

Nivruttinath advised Dnyaneshwar to write an independent philosophical work. This work later came to be known as Amrutanubhav.

== Death and Resting Place ==
After the Samadhi of Dnyaneshwar, Nivruttinath left Alandi with his sister, Muktabai for a pilgrimage. During a thunderstorm, Muktabai was lost. Nivruttinath then attained Samadhi. His resting place is situated near Trimbakeshwar, a temple has been erected which is visited by numerous devotees.

== See also ==
- Dnyaneshwar
- Sopan
- Muktabai
- Bhakti movement
- Changdev Maharaj
