= Kulkarni =

Indian family name

Kulkarni is a surname. The name "Kulkarni" is a combination of two words (kula and karni). Kula means "family", and Karanika means "archivist". Historically, Kulkarni was the title given to the village record keeper.

As per the historian P.J. Marshall, both Kulkarni and Deshpande were specialized scribes who "served great households and enhanced other, familiar, administrative mechanisms at their disposal".

== History ==
Before British rule, the Maharashtra region was divided into many revenue divisions. The medieval equivalent of a county or district was the pargana. The chief of the pargana was called Deshmukh and record keepers were called Deshpande. The lowest administrative unit was the village. Village society in Marathi areas included the Patil or the head of the village, collector of revenue, and Kulkarni, the village record-keeper. These were hereditary positions. The Patil usually came from the Maratha caste. The Kulkarni was usually from literate communities such as Brahmin (mainly from Deshastha and the Karhade sub-castes) and CKP castes. The Kulkarni operated at the village level but at a pargana level, the recordkeeper had titles such as Deshkulkarni, Deshpande, or Nadkarni (in Karnataka). The Kulkarni watans (land rights) were abolished in 1950.

== Notable Kulkarni ==
=== Saints ===
- Dnyaneshwar: Pre-sainthood name Dnyandev Kulkarni (1275–1296)
- Eknath: Pre-sainthood name Eknāth Kulkarni (1533–1599)
- Samarth Ramdas: Pre-sainthood name Narayan Kulkarni (Thosar) (1608–1681)
- Nivruttinath: Pre-sainthood name Nivrutti Kulkarni, elder brother and teacher of Dnyaneshwar
- Sopan: Pre-sainthood name Sopan Kulkarni
- Muktabai: Pre-sainthood name Mukta Kulkarni
- Mahipati: Chronicler of many Indian saints, author of the Bhaktavijaya (1715–1790)

=== Historic figures ===
- Ramchandra Pant Amatya (1650–1716): The third Peshwa, Finance Minister (Amatya) to Emperor (Chhatrapati) Shivaji and Imperial Regent (Hukumat Panah)
- Parshuram Trimbak Kulkarni (1660–1718): Held post of Pant Pratinidhi, the fifth Peshwa and the founder of Aundh and Vishalgad princely states.

=== Entertainment ===
- Atul Kulkarni: Marathi film and theater actor
- Chandrakant Kulkarni: Film director
- Girish Kulkarni: Marathi film actor
- Mamta Kulkarni: Bollywood actress
- Mrinal Dev-Kulkarni: Marathi television actress.
- Saleel Kulkarni: Marathi singer and composer
- Sandeep Kulkarni: Marathi actor
- Sonali Kulkarni: Bollywood actress
- Sonalee Kulkarni: Marathi film actress
- Umesh Vinayak Kulkarni: Film Director

=== Literature ===
- G. A. Kulkarni (1923–1987): Short story writer

=== Sports ===
- Nilesh Kulkarni: Indian cricketer
- Raju Kulkarni: Former Indian cricketer
- Shubhangi Kulkarni: Indian woman cricketer and secretary of the Women's Cricket Association of India
- Vineet Kulkarni: Indian cricket umpire

=== Professionals ===
- Ravi S. Kulkarni (born 1942): Indian mathematician
- Sudha Kulkarni Murty: Kannada writer, Founder of Sudha Murty Foundation and wife of N. R. Narayana Murthy
- Suhas Kulkarni (born 1950), Indian-American politician
- Shrinivas Kulkarni (born 4 October 1956): US-based astronomer born and raised in India

== See also ==
- Marathi people
- Deshpande
- Patwari
- Patil
- Indian honorifics
- Indian feudalism
- Deshmukh
- Jagirdar
- Lambardar
- Mankari
- Sarpanch
- Zaildar
- Zamindar
