= Haripath =

Hindu poetry collection

The Haripath is a collection of twenty-eight abhangas (poems) revealed to the thirteenth-century Marathi Saint, Dnyaneshwar. It is recited by Varkaris each day.

The Haripath consists of a series of 28 ecstatic musical poems or Abhangs which repeatedly praise the value of chanting God's names and describe the benefits that may be gained by doing so.

== Bibliography ==
- L'Invocation: Le Haripath de Dnyandev, by Charlotte Vaudeville (Paris: Ecole Francaise D'Extreme-Orient, 1969)
