= Ramavallabhadas =

17th-century Marathi poet

Ramavallabhadas (born Tukopant) was a Marathi poet and commentator. Precise historical records regarding his birth and death dates are unavailable, resulting in varying scholarly and traditional estimates. According to L. R. Pangarkar, his lifespan was from 1588 to 1648 (Shaka 1510 to 1570), whereas traditional sectarian tradition places his period between 1609 and 1668 (Shaka 1531 to 1590). In Maharashtra Saraswat, author V. L. Bhave estimates his birth year to be Shaka 1532 (1610 CE).

== Life ==
Ramavallabhadas was born as Tukopant. His father, Ambajipant (also known as Yamajipant Raleraskar), served as an administrator (karbhari) for the ruler of Devagiri (Daulatabad Fort). Ramavallabhadas eventually succeeded his father in this administrative role.

He later participated in a battle against an invading foreign army. Following the victory of the King of Daulatabad, the defeated enemy forces were plundered, during which Ramavallabhadas acquired a copy of the Eknathi Bhagavata. Reading this work gradually inspired in him a spirit of worldly renunciation. He subsequently sought spiritual initiation from a holy man named Lakshmidhara, who conferred upon him the spiritual name "Ramavallabhadas".

== Literary works ==
Ramavallabhadas composed several religious commentaries, treatises, and devotional poems. His literary works include:

- Chamatkarik Tika, a commentary on the Bhagavad Gita.
- Vakyavritti, a commentary on Shankaracharya's Brihadvakyavritti.
- Dashakanirdhara, a text based on the tenth canto (Dasham Skandha) of the Bhagavata.
- Guruvali, a treatise dedicated to praising the greatness of the guru.
- Santanamavali.
- Prabodhachandrika, a collection of eleven letters composed in the ovi meter, addressed to his disciple Avadabai.
- Numerous abhangas and padas (devotional songs).
- Vaishnavagati, an unavailable (lost) text attributed to him.

== Teachings and legacy ==
Ramavallabhadas actively propagated Krishna devotion (Krishna bhakti). A defining feature of his poetry is the devotional praise (sankirtana) of Krishna's life, and his compositions are recognized for their gentle and sweet tone.

His spiritual tradition is preserved in regions including Goa and Karwar. His disciple, Avadabai, established a monastery (matha) in the town of Mallapuram, where Krishna Jayanti is celebrated on an annual basis.
