= Eknathi Bhagwat =

Marathi book

Eknathi Bhagwat is a book written by Sant Eknath, a 16th-century Hindu saint who wrote in Marathi. It is a translation of book 11 of the Bhagavata Purana into Marathi, which covers "stern morality." This is major work of Varkari Sampradaya.
