= Dnyaneshwar =

13th century Marathi saint

Sant Dnyaneshwar
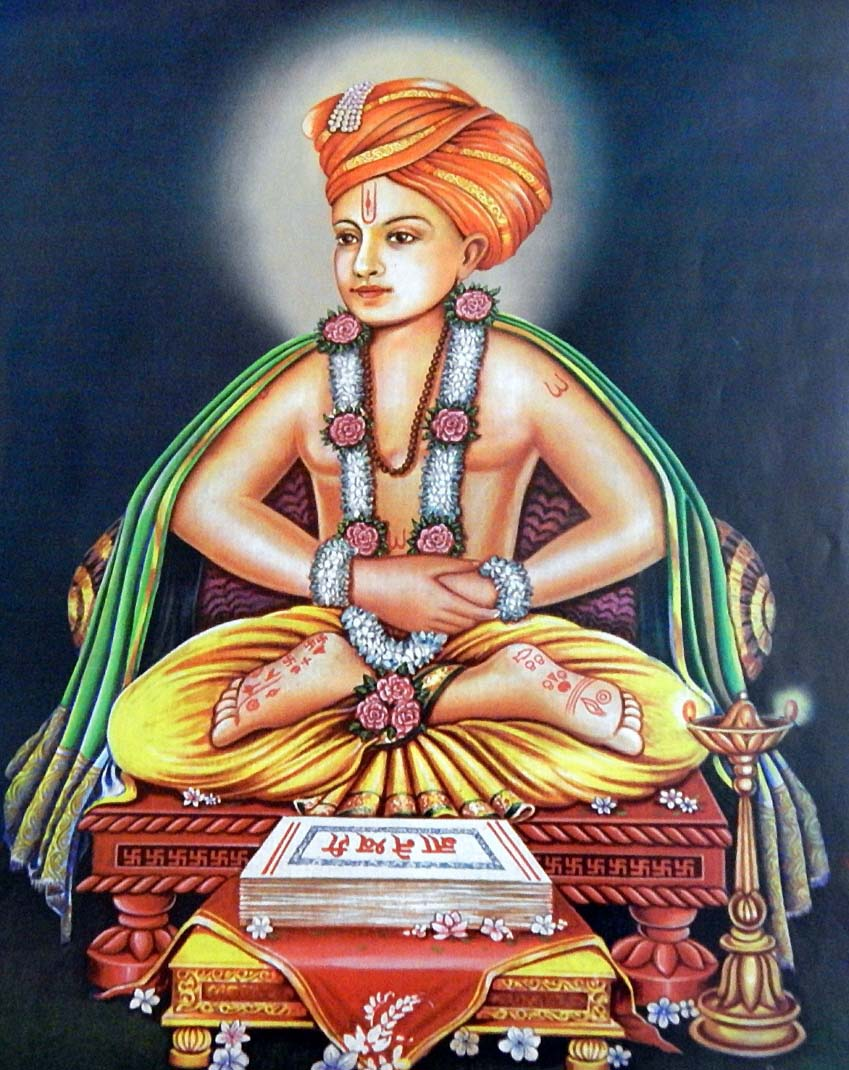
- Title: Sant Dnyaneshwar

Personal life
- Born: Dnyaneshwar; 1275 Apegaon, Yadava dynasty (present-day Paithan Taluka, Chhatrapati Sambhajinagar district, Maharashtra, India)
- Died: 1296 (aged 20–21)
- Resting place: Alandi, Yadava dynasty (present-day Khed Taluka, Pune District, Maharashtra, India)
- Parents: Vithala Pant (father); Rukmini Bai (mother)
- Notable work(s): Dnyaneshwari, Amrutanubhav, Changdev Paasashti, Haripath, abhang devotional poetry
- Honors: Sant (Saint), Dev (God) and Māulī (Mother)

Religious life
- Religion: Hinduism
- Philosophy: Advaita, Varkari

Religious career
- Teacher: Nivruttinath (elder brother)

Sant Dnyaneshwar (Marathi pronunciation: [d̪ɲaːn̪eʃʋəɾ]), (Devanagari : सन्त ज्ञानेश्वर), also referred to as Jñāneśvara, Jñānadeva, Dnyandev or Mauli or Dnyandev Vitthal Kulkarni (1275–1296 (living samadhi)), was a 13th-century Indian Marathi saint, poet, philosopher and yogi of the Nath and Varkari tradition. In his short life of 21 years, he authored Dnyaneshwari (a commentary on the Bhagavad Gita) and Amrutanubhav. These are the oldest surviving literary works in the Marathi language, and considered to be milestones in Marathi literature. Sant Dnyaneshwar's ideas reflect the non-dualistic Advaita Vedanta philosophy and an emphasis on Yoga and bhakti towards Vithoba, an incarnation of Vishnu. His legacy inspired saint-poets such as Eknath and Tukaram, and he is one of the founders of the Varkari (Vithoba-Krishna) Bhakti movement tradition of Hinduism in Maharashtra. Dnyaneshwar undertook samadhi at Alandi in 1296 by entombing himself in an underground chamber.

== Biography ==
Dnyaneshwar was born in 1275 (on the auspicious day of Krishna Janmashtami) in a Marathi family in the Apegaon village on the banks of Godavari river near Paithan in Maharashtra during the reign of the Yadava king Ramadevarava. The kingdom with its capital Devagiri enjoyed relative peace and stability, and the king was a patron of literature and arts.

Biographical details of Sant Dnyaneshwar's life are preserved in the writings of his disciples, Satyamalanath and Sachchidanand. The various traditions give conflicting accounts of details of Dnyaneshwar's life. The date of composition of his work Dnyaneshwari (1290 CE), however is undisputed. According to the more accepted tradition on Dnyaneshwar's life, he was born in 1275 CE and he attained samadhi in 1296 CE. Other sources state he was born in 1271 CE.

=== Life ===
The biographical details of Dnyaneshwar's short life of about 21 years are well established. The available accounts are filled with hagiographic legends and miracles he performed, such as his ability to make a buffalo sing the Vedas and humble a sadhak (Changdev) by riding a moving wall.

According to the accounts that have survived, Dnyaneshwar's father Vitthal pant was the kulkarni (accountant who maintained land and tax records in villages) of a village called Ape gaon on the banks of the Godavari River in Maharashtra, a profession he had inherited from his ancestors. He married Rakhna Bai, the daughter of the Kulkarni of Alandi. Even as a householder, Vitthal pant longed for spiritual learning. His disillusionment with life grew as a result of the death of his father and because he had no children from his marriage. Eventually, with his wife's consent, he renounced worldly life and left for Kashi to become a sannyasin (renunciate). There he met a guru (spiritual teacher), decided to renounce without his wife's consent.

Vitthalpant was initiated by his spiritual teacher, Ramashram (according to abhangas of Saint Namdeva), in Kashi. When Ramashram Swami visited Alandi and met Rukminibai by chance, he blessed her saying, "May you lead a happy married life." With tears in her eyes, Rukmini said that it was not possible since her husband had gone away to Kashi and become a sanyasin. On finding out that her husband was none other than his disciple Vitthalpant, Swami, on returning to Kashi, reprimanded Vitthalpant and sent him back to Alandi. At Alandi, he rejoined his wife and again became a householder. After Vitthalpant returned to his wife and settled down in Alandi, Rakhumabai gave birth to four children—Nivruttinath (1273 CE), Dnyaneshwar (1275 CE), Sopan (1277 CE) and Muktabai (1279 CE).

Brahmins saw a renunciate returning to his life as a householder as heresy. Dnyaneshwar and his brothers were denied the right to have the sacred thread ceremony for the full admission to the Brahmin caste. All brahmins excommunicated the Kulkarni family, denied them work, the right to buy food from the market or even interact with other villagers.

Vitthal Kulkarni eventually left the town for Nashik with his family. One day while performing his daily rituals, Vitthal came face to face with a tiger. Vitthal and three of his four children escaped, but Nivruttinath became separated from the family and hid in a cave. While hiding in the cave he met Gahaninath, who initiated Nivruttinath into the wisdom of the Nath yogis. Later, Vitthal Kulkarni returned to Alandi and asked the Brahmins to suggest a means of atonement for his sins; they suggest committing suicide as penance. Vitthal and his wife gave up their lives, within a year of each other by jumping into the Indrayani river in the hope their children might be able to lead lives free of persecution. Other sources and local folk tradition claim that the parents committed suicide by jumping in the Indrayani River. Another version of the legend states that Vitthalpant, the father threw himself into Ganges River to expiate his sin.

Dnyaneshwar and his siblings were accepted by and initiated into the Nath tradition to which their parents already belonged, where the three brothers and the sister Muktabai all became celebrated yogis and Bhakti poets.

=== Travel and Samadhi ===
After Dnyaneshwar had written Amrutanubhav, the siblings visited Pandharpur where they met Namdev, who became a close friend of Dnyaneshwar. Dnyaneshwar and Namadev embarked on a pilgrimage to various holy centers across India where they initiated many people into the Varkari sect; Dnyaneshwar's devotional compositions called Abhangas are believed to have been formulated during this period. On their return to Pandharpur, Dnyaneshwar and Namdev were honored with a feast in which, according to Bahirat, many contemporary saints such as "Goroba the potter, Sanvata the gardener, Chokhoba the untouchable and Parisa Bhagwat the ritualist priest" participated. Some scholars accept the traditional view that Namdev and Dnyaneshwar were contemporaries; however, others such as W. B. Patwardhan, R. G. Bhandarkar and R. Bharadvaj disagree with this view and date Namdev to the late 14th century instead.

After the feast, Dnyaneshwar desired to go into sanjeevan samadhi, a practice to voluntarily leave one's mortal body after entering into a deep meditative state, as practiced in Ashtanga Yoga of ancient India. Preparations for the Sanjeevan Samadhi were made by Namdev's sons. Regarding Sanjeevan Samadhi, Dnyaneshwar himself had emphatically talked about the relationship between higher awareness and light or pure energy. On the 13th day of the dark half of the Kartik month of the Hindu Calendar, in Alandi, Dnyaneshwar, who was then twenty-one years old, entered into Sanjeevan samadhi. His samadhi lies in the Siddheshvara Temple complex in Alandi. Namdev and other bystanders grieved his death. According to tradition, Dnyaneshwar was brought back to life to meet Namdev when the latter prayed to Vithoba for his return. Dallmayr writes that this testifies to "the immortality of genuine friendship and companionship of noble and loving hearts". Many Varkari devotees believe that Dnyaneshwar is still alive.

=== Miracles ===
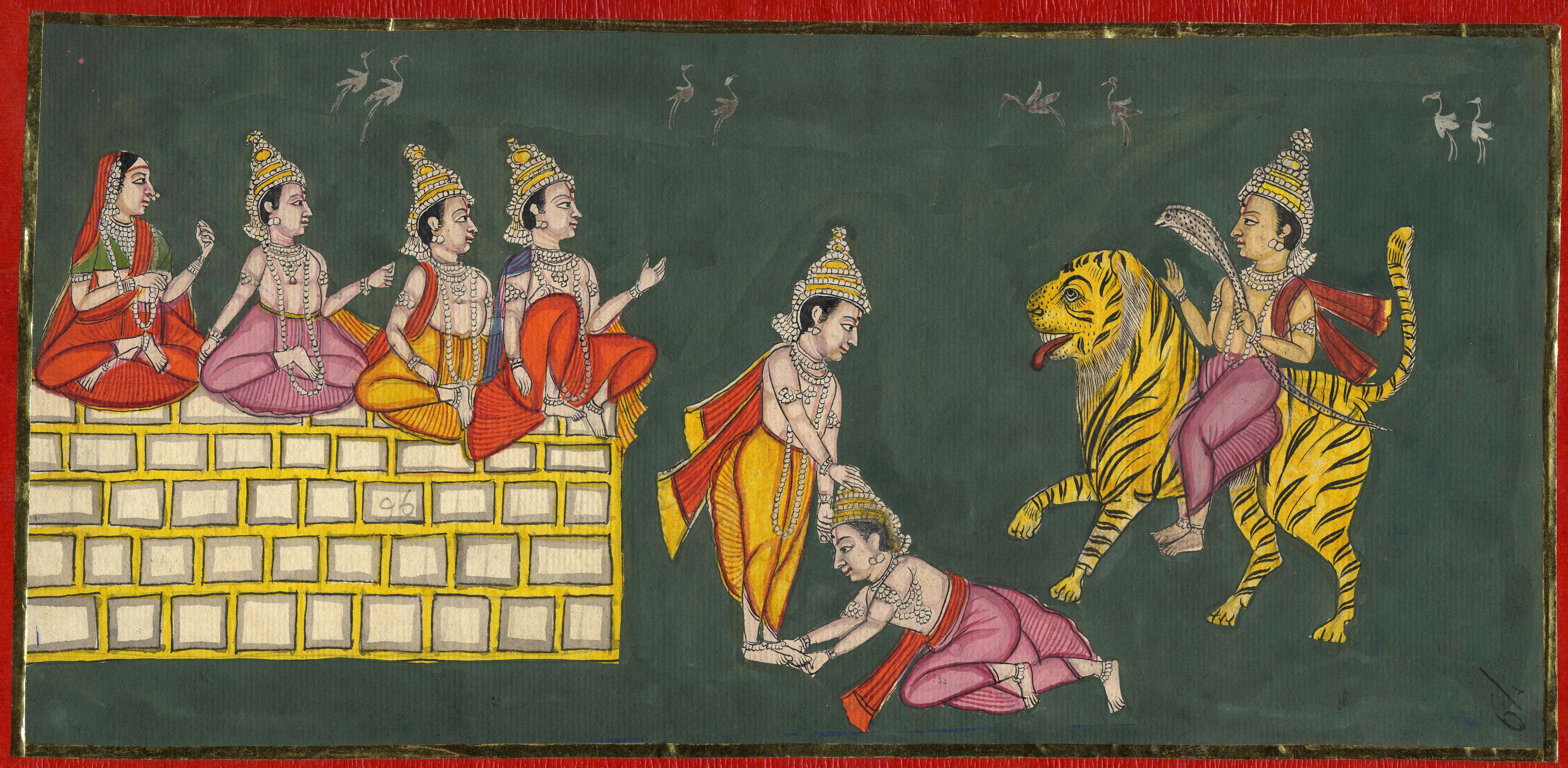
The siblings Muktabai, Sopan, Dnyaneshwar and Nivruttinath seated on the flying wall greet Changdev seated on a tiger. In the centre, Changdev bows to Dnyaneshwar.

There are a few stories about miracles came to be associated with Dnyaneshwar's life, one of which was the revival of his disciple Sachchidanand's corpse. Fred Dallmyr summarizes one of these legends as follows from the hagiography by Mahipati: At age 12, Dnyaneshwar with his impoverished and outcaste siblings, went to Paithan to plead mercy from Paithan brahmins, they were insulted and ridiculed. As the children were suffering the bullying, on a nearby road was a man who was violently lashing an old buffalo, and the injured animal collapsed in tears. Dnyaneshwar asked the buffalo owner to stop out of concern for the animal. The priests ridiculed him for being more concerned about a beast and unconcerned about the teachings of the Vedas. Dnyaneshwar retorted that the Vedas themselves held all life to be sacred and a manifestation of the god. (Note: According to Jeaneane D. Fowler, former Head of Philosophy and Religious Studies at the University of Wales, brahman is the "ultimate Reality, the Source from which all emanates, the unchanging absolute".) The outraged priests pointed out that his logic implied that beasts should be able to learn the Vedas as well. An undeterred Dnyaneshwar then placed his hand on the buffalo's forehead and it started reciting a Vedic verse in a deep voice. According to Fred Dallmayr, one may not be concerned whether this story accurately reflects Dnyaneshwar's biography, the story does have symbolic significance in the same manner as the story about Jesus in Jerusalem in Matthew 3:9.

In another miracle, Dnyaneshwar was challenged by Changdev, an accomplished yogi who rode on a tiger with his magical powers, to replicate this feat. Dnyaneshwar humbled Changdev by riding on a moving wall. (Note: The story of the holy man riding a tiger /lion and the other encountering him on a moving wall has been found in many other religions including Buddhism, Sikhism, and the Abrahamic religions as well.) Dnyaneshwar's advice to Changdev was given in 65 verses called the Changdev Pasasthi. Changdev became a disciple of Dnyaneshwar's sister Muktabai.

== Writings ==
According to B. P. Bahirat, Dnyaneshwar was the first known philosopher who wrote in the Marathi language. At about age 16, he composed Dnyaneshwari in the year 1290, a commentary on Bhagavad Gita which later became a fundamental text of the Varkari sect. His words were recorded by Sacchidananda, who agreed to become Dnyaneshwar's amanuensis. Dnyaneshwari was written using the Ovi; a metre, which was first used to compose women's songs in Maharashtra, of four lines where the first three or the first and third lines rhyme and the fourth line has a sharp and short ending. According to W. B. Patwardhan, a scholar on Dnyaneshwar, with Dnyaneshwar the ovi "trips, it gallops, it dances, it whirls, it ambles, it trots, it runs, it takes long leaps or short jumps, it halts or sweeps along, it evolves a hundred and one graces at the master's command". In Dnyaneshwari, at last he wrote "Pasaayadana" in which he prayed everything for others and all humanity and nothing for himself. Saint Dnyaneshwar himself believed that "The whole world has one soul- या विश्वाचा आत्मा एक आहे".

O, God! Thou art Ganesha, the illuminator of all intelligence. The servant of Nivritti says, attend to my story. The Vedas in their perfection is as the beautiful image of the god, of which the flawless words are the resplendent body. The Smritis are the limbs thereof, the marking of verses shows their structure, and in the meaning lies a veritable treasure-house of beauty.

— Dnyanesvari
Transl: Pradhan, Lambert

His first text Dnyanesvari was in the vernacular Marathi language, as opposed to the classical Sanskrit language. He wrote Dnyaneshwari in the Marathi language so that common people could understand philosophical aspects of life which were then understood only by those who knew Sanskrit (i.e. the higher priestly classes). Thus, this was a significant work in Indian history which simplified philosophy to the common man.

According to Bhagwat, like other Bhakti poets, Dnyaneshwar's choice of the vernacular language was an important departure from the prevailing cultural hegemony of Sanskrit and high–caste Hinduism, a trend which continued with later bhakti poets across India. Dnyaneshwar is to the Marathi literature what Dante is to the Italian, states Bhagwat.

According to tradition, Nivruttinath was not satisfied with the commentary and asked Dnyaneshwar to write an independent philosophical work. This work later came to be known as Amrutanubhava. Scholars differ on the chronology of the Dnyaneshwari and Amrutanubhav. Patwardhan has argued that Amrutanubhav is an earlier text than Dnyaneshwari because the latter is richer in use of metaphors and imagery, and displays greater familiarity with many different philosophical systems, such as Samkhya and Yoga. However, both Bahirat and Ranade disagree with this view pointing out that in Amrutanubhava, author displays familiarity with involved philosophical concepts such as Mayavada and Shunyavada, and while the text has simpler language, it reveals Dnyaneshwar's "philosophical depth".

Dnyaneshwar's devotional compositions called Abhangas are believed to have been formulated during his pilgrimage to Pandharpur and other holy places when he got initiated into the Varkari tradition.

=== Influences ===
"Like a good farmer giving up his old business and beginning something new every day, the man overpowered by ignorance installs images of gods, often and again and worships them with the same intensity. He becomes the disciple of the guru who is surrounded by worldly pomp, gets initiated by him and is unwilling to see any other person who has got real spiritual dignity. He is cruel to every being, worships various stone images and has no consistency of heart."

— Dnyaneshwari
Transl: Fred Dallmayr

The Mahanubhava sect and the Nath Yogi tradition were two prominent movements during Dnyaneshwar's time that influenced his works. Mahanubhavas were devotees of Krishna who disregarded the caste system, the Vedas and only promotes the worship of the deity Vitthala (Vishnu). Dnyaneshwar differed significantly from Mahanubhava's religious precepts. His thought was founded on the philosophy of the Upanishads and the Bhagavad Gita, and devotion to Vitthala formed the cornerstone of the egalitarian Varkari sect founded by Dnyaneshwar. However, the literary style adopted by Mahanubhava writers influenced Dnyaneshwar's works. According to R. D. Ranade, Dnyaneshwar "stands to Mahanubhavas just in the same relation which Shakespeare stood to Elizabethan writers".

Dnyaneshwar was initiated into the Nath Yogi tradition by his brother Nivruttinath, sometime after the death of their parents; Sopana and Muktabai were initiated into the tradition by Dnyaneshwar himself. Founded by Gorakshanath, (Note: Matsyendranath is often called the founder of the Nath Yogi sect. However, his historicity is uncertain.) the Nath Yogi sect had introduced the system of Hatha Yoga, which emphasised on yogic poses and physical fitness. Gahaninath, a disciple of Gorakshanath, had initiated Nivruttinath into the Nath Yogi tradition. Dnyaneshwar's non-dualistic philosophy, usage of a vernacular language in his writing and an emphasis on yoga and oneness of Vishnu and Shiva were his inheritances from the Nath Yogi tradition.

The values of Universal brotherhood and compassion espoused in his works came from his interactions with the devotional Vitthala sect, a tradition which was already in existence during Dnyaneshwar's time. J. N. Farquhar also notes the influence of Bhagavata Purana on Dnyaneshwar's poetry.

== Philosophy ==
=== Ontology and epistemology ===
"It is a pure knowledge itself that is not enlightened by any other knowledge or darkened by ignorance. But can the pure consciousness be conscious of itself? Can the eyeball perceive itself? Can the sky enter into itself? Can the fire burn itself... Therefore, that which is pure consciousness itself, without the quality of being conscious is not conscious of itself.

— Amrutanubhava.
Translator: B.P. Bahirat

Dnyaneshwar takes up the examination of being or brahman (Note: Amrutanubhav doesn't explicitly use the word brahman.) in Amrutanubhava. He considers being to be the substratum of thought which enables thought and cognition. Since being is prior to thought and concepts, it is distinct from Kantian categories, and methods of thought such as epistemological analysis cannot be applied to it. Dnyaneshwar believes that reality is self–evident and does not require any proof. It antedates dualistic divisions into knower and known, existence and nonexistence, subject and object, knowledge and ignorance.

Dnyaneshwar highlights the limitations of traditional epistemological methods (pramanas) used in Indian philosophy. (Note: Sense–perception (pratyaksha), inference (anumana), scriptural testimony (shabda), analogy (upamana), presumption (arthapatti) and non–apprehension (anupaladbdhi) are the six sources of knowledge accepted to varying degrees in various schools of Indian philosophy.) He points out that any perception is validated only by another deeper understanding, while in establishing the rationality of reason, reason itself is transcended. Dnyaneshwar even cautions against reliance on scriptural testimony, which is accepted as a valid source of knowledge by philosophers of Vedanta and Mīmāṃsā schools of philosophy. Scriptural validity, to him, stems from its congruence with experiential truth and not vice versa.

=== Ethics ===
Dnyaneshwar's moral philosophy comes out in his exposition of the 13th of Bhagavad Gita, in his commentary on the book Dnyaneshwari. He considers humility; non–injury in action, thought and words; forbearance in the face of adversity; dispassion towards sensory pleasures; purity of heart and mind; love of solitude and devotion towards one's Guru and God as virtues; and their corresponding moral opposites as vices. A pessimistic view of one's life is considered as a necessary condition for spiritual growth in Dnyaneshwari. Dnyaneshwar writes that saints do not perceive distinctions and are humble because they identify all objects, animate or inanimate, with their own Self.

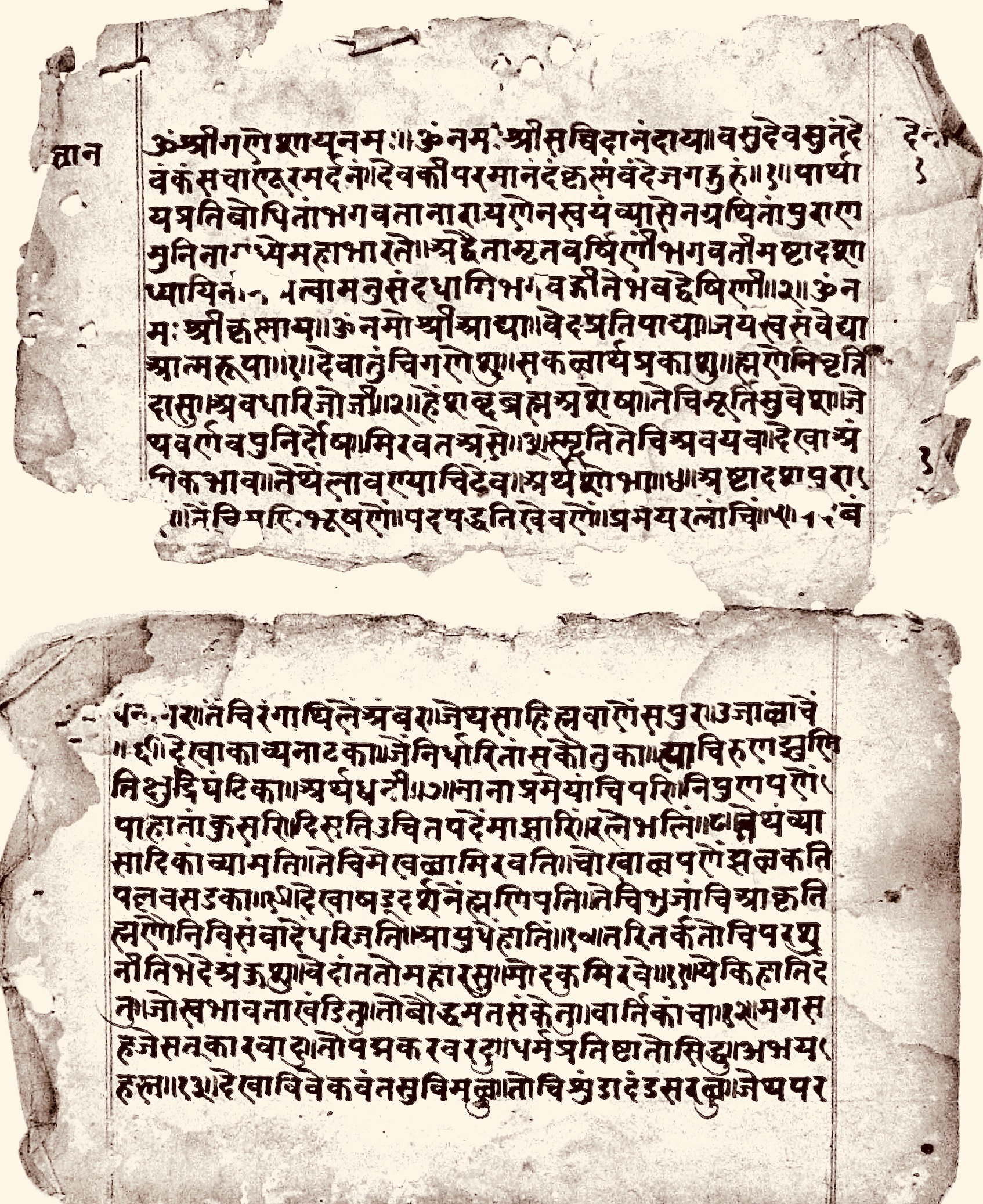
Dnyaneshwar's ideas are based on the Bhagavad Gita. Above: Dnyaneshwari pages in Devanagari script, Marathi language.

Many chapters of Dnyaneshwari begins with an invocation to his Guru Nivruttinath, whose guidance he describes as the means to "cross the ocean of existence". The discussion on virtue and vices continues in his elucidation of the 16th chapter of Bhagavad Gita, where they are called divine heritages and demonic heritages respectively. Divine heritage comprises fearlessness, which comes from a belief in unity of all objects; charity; sacrifice, (Note: According to Dnyaneshwar, true sacrifice is one in which there is no yearning for results of one's actions and in which the sattva dominates.) which comes from performing one's duties and compassion in addition to virtues already enumerated; while demonic heritage consists of six vices— ignorance, anger, arrogance, hypocrisy, harshness and pride.

The doctrine of Karma Yoga in the Bhagavad Gita is resurrected in Dnyaneshwari, where Dnyaneshwar examines achieving actionlessness through action and harmony between the two. In the fourth chapter, the ideal karma yogi's actions are compared to the apparent movement of the Sun, which while appearing to rise and set is actually stationary; (Note: Ranade is struck by the reference to the heliocentric model in Dnyaneshwari. He writes that "It is a matter of great astronomic interest that this mystic philosopher should have put forth a heliocentric theory at a time when heliocentrism was hardly recognized in Europe. This is, however, by the bye.".) similarly, a karma yogi, though appears to act, doesn't really act. Performance of one's duties, acting without egoism, renunciation of the fruits of one's actions and offering one's actions to God are four ways which, according to Dnyaneshwar, result in actionlessness and Self–realisation. Dnyaneshwar's metaphysical conclusion that the world is a manifestation of the divine, and not an illusion, also creates an ethical framework which rejects renunciation and recommends performing one's duties and actions in the spirit of worship.

Traditional Indian scriptures see Ṛta, a Hindu theological term similar to dharma, as a natural law that governs both the cosmos and human society. Performance of one's duties to uphold social institutions, such as marriage and family, thus becomes imperative, and duty overrides individual freedom. Dnyaneshwar is in agreement with tradition; he believes that divine order and moral order are one and the same and are inherent in the universe itself. He, therefore, recommends that all social institutions be protected and preserved in their totality. However, when it comes to the institution of caste, his approach becomes more humanitarian and he advocates spiritual egalitarianism.

== Reception and legacy ==
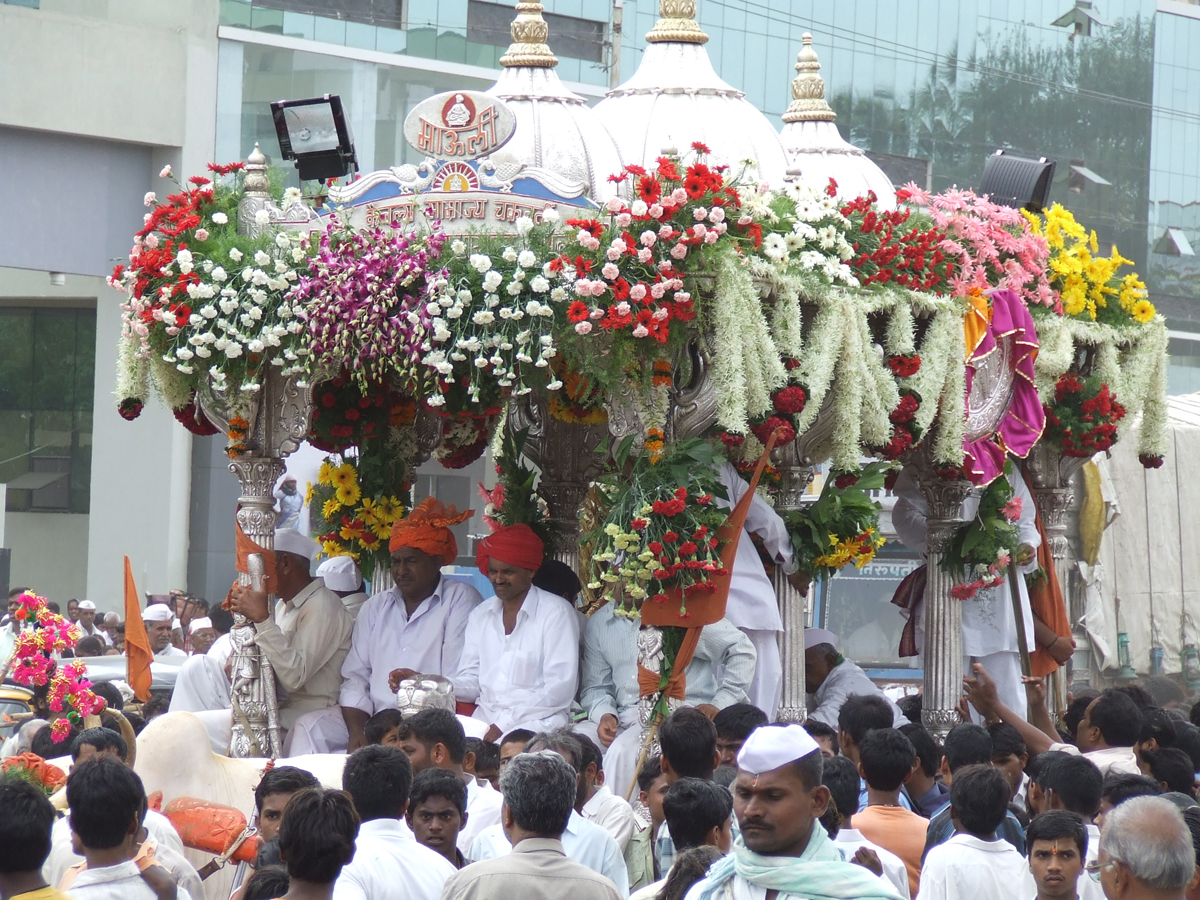
Dnyaneshwar's palkhi (palanquin), carrying the sandals of the saint, in a silver cart pulled by Oxen on a journey from Alandi to Pandharpur.

Elements of Dnyaneshwar's life and writings, such as his criticism of parochialism of the priestly elite, a celebration of the family life and spiritual egalitarianism, would shape the culture of the Varkari movement. According to Dallmayr, Dnyaneshwar's life and writings have "developed into primary exemplars of genuine religiosity for the Varkari movement, as well as crucial sources and focal points of bhakti devotion".

Devotees of the Varkari sect in the Hindu Shaka month of Ashadh join an annual pilgrimage called the Wari with symbolic Sandals (called Paduka in Marathi) of Dynaneshwar carried in a palkhi from Dnyaneshwar's shrine in Alandi to the Vitthala temple in Pandharpur . The Padukas (sandals) of Dnyaneshwar are carried in a Palkhi (palanquin) for the Dnyaneshwar inspired works of later poet-saints of the Varkari movement.

His philosophy of chidvilas was adapted by Varkari writers, such as Namdev and Eknath, to their own works. Amrutanubhava's influence is visible in Eknath's Hastamalak and Swatmsukha. Tukaram's works imbibe and explain Dnyaneshwar's philosophical concepts such as the refutation of Mayavada.

== In popular culture ==
A 1940 Marathi film, Sant Dnyaneshwar, directed by Vishnupant Govind Damle and Sheikh Fattelal, was a biopic on Sant Dnyaneshwar's life. Since 2021, a Marathi language TV serial named 'Dnyaneshwar Mauli' is airing on the Sony Marathi channel.

== Works ==
Undisputed authorship

- Dnyaneshwari or Bhavarthdipika (1290 CE)
- Amrutanubhava or Anubhavamrita (1292 CE)
- Changdev Pasashti (1294 CE)
- Haripath
- Abhangas

Works attributed to Dnyaneshwar

- Commentary on Yoga Vasistha
- Pavana-Vijaya
- Pancikarana

== See also ==
- Bhakti movement
- Chokhamela
- Eknath
- Janabai
- Muktabai
- Namdev
- Nivruttinath
- Pandharpur Wari – the largest annual pilgrimage in Maharashtra that includes a ceremonial Palkhi of Tukaram and Dnyaneshwar.
- Sant Mat
- Sant Soyarabai
- Sopan
- Tukaram
- Sant Gulabrao Maharaj

== Sources ==
- Attwood, Donald W. (1992), Raising cane: the political economy of sugar in western India, Westview Press, ISBN 978-0-8133-1287-3
- Bahirat, B. P. (2006), The Saint heritage of India, Cosmo Publications, ISBN 978-81-307-0124-0
- Balasubramanian, R. (2000), "2", Advaita Vedānta, vol. 2, Project of History of Indian Science Philosophy and Culture, ISBN 978-81-87586-04-3
- Berntsen, Maxine (1988), The Experience of Hinduism: Essays on Religion in Maharashtra, SUNY Press, ISBN 978-0-88706-662-7
- Bobde, P. V. (1987), Garland of Divine Flowers: Selected Devotional Lyrics of Saint Jnanesvara, Motilal Banarsidass, ISBN 978-81-208-0390-9
- Cashman, Richard I. (1975), The Myth of the Lokamanya: Tilak and Mass Politics in Maharashtra, University of California Press, ISBN 978-0-520-02407-6
- Claus, Peter J.; Diamond, Sarah; Mills, Margaret Ann (2003), South Asian Folklore: An Encyclopedia : Afghanistan, Bangladesh, India, Nepal, Pakistan, Sri Lanka, Taylor & Francis, ISBN 978-0-415-93919-5
- Dallmayr, Fred (2007), In Search of the Good Life: A Pedogogy for Troubled Times, University Press of Kentucky, ISBN 978-0-8131-3858-9
- Datta, Amaresh (1988), Encyclopaedia of Indian Literature, Sahitya Akademi, ISBN 978-81-260-1194-0
- De Smet, Richard V.; Malkovsky, Bradley J. (2000), New Perspectives on Advaita Vedānta: Essays in Commemoration of Professor Richard De Smet, S.J., BRILL, ISBN 90-04-11666-4
- Bhagwat, R.K (2002), Indian Literary Criticism: Theory and Interpretation (Editor: G.N. Devy), Orient Blackswan, ISBN 978-81-250-2022-6
- Dhongde, Ramesh Vaman; Wali, Kashi (2009), Marathi, John Benjamins Publishing Company, ISBN 978-90-272-8883-7
- Farquhar, John Nicol (1984), An Outline of the Religious Literature of India, Motilal Banarsidass Publ, ISBN 978-0-89581-765-5
- Fowler, Jeaneane D. (2002), Perspectives of Reality: An Introduction to the Philosophy of Hinduism, Sussex Academic Press, ISBN 978-1-898723-93-6
- Ganesh, Kamala; Thakkar, Usha (2005), Culture and the Making of Identity in Contemporary India, SAGE Publications, ISBN 978-0-7619-3381-6
- Glushkova, Irina (2014), Objects of Worship in South Asian Religions: Forms, Practices and Meanings, Routledge, ISBN 978-1-317-67595-2
- Grover, Verinder (1990), Mahadev Govind Ranade, Deep & Deep Publications, ISBN 978-81-7100-245-0
- Harrisson, Tom (1976), Living Through the Blitz, Cambridge University Press, ISBN 978-0-00-216009-4
- Kohn, Livia (2008), Chinese Healing Exercises: The Tradition of Daoyin, University of Hawaii Press, ISBN 978-0-8248-3269-8
- Michell, George; Zebrowski, Mark (1999), Architecture and Art of the Deccan Sultanates, Cambridge University Press, ISBN 978-0-521-56321-5
- Mokashi, Digambar Balkrishna (1987), Palkhi: An Indian Pilgrimage, SUNY Press, ISBN 978-0-88706-461-6
- Mokashi-Punekar, Rohini (2005), On the Threshold, Rowman Altamira, ISBN 978-0-7591-0821-9
- Novetzke, Christian Lee (2009), Shared Idioms, Sacred Symbols, and the Articulation of Identities in South Asia, Routledge, ISBN 978-1-135-90477-7
- O'Connell, Joseph T. (1999), Organizational and institutional aspects of Indian religious movements, Indian Institute of Advanced Study, Manohar, ISBN 9788185952628
- Pawar, G. M. (1997), Medieval Indian Literature: Surveys and selections, Sahitya Akademi, ISBN 978-81-260-0365-5
- Prasad, Rajendra (2009), A Historical-developmental Study of Classical Indian Philosophy of Morals, Concept Publishing Company, ISBN 978-81-8069-595-7
- Dnyaneshwar, Shri (1987). Jnaneshvari (Bhavarthadipika). Pradhan, Vitthal G. (Transl); Lambert, Hester M. (Transl, Editor). State University of New York Press. ISBN 978-0-88706-487-6.
- Ranade, Ramchandra Dattatraya (1933), Mysticism in India: The Poet-Saints of Maharashtra, SUNY Press, ISBN 978-0-87395-669-7
- Schomer, Karine; McLeod, W. H. (1987), The Sants: Studies in a Devotional Tradition of India, Motilal Banarsidass, ISBN 978-81-208-0277-3
- Sharma, Arvind (1979), Thresholds in Hindu-Buddhist Studies, T.K. Mukherjee, ISBN 9780836404951
- Sundararajan, K. R.; Mukerji, Bithika (2003), Hindu Spirituality: Postclassical and Modern, Motilal Banarsidass, ISBN 978-81-208-1937-5
