= Amrutanubhav =

Experience of immortality by Sant Dhaneshwar

Amrutanubhav or Amritanubhav is a composition by the Marathi saint and poet Jñāneśvar during the 13th century. It is considered to be a milestone in Marathi literature.

== Etymology of the name ==
Amrutanubhav is composed of two Marathi words Amrut (derived from Amrita which translates as immortal Elixir in Sanskrit) and Anubhav meaning experience. As a result, it literally translates to "the experience of immortality" in Sanskrit/ Marathi.

== About the work ==
On advice from his guru, Nivruttinath, Jñāneśvar created an original work to state his experiences in yoga and philosophy. Although the work did not achieve as much fame as the Jñāneśvari, it is still considered as one of the most important ones in Marathi literature. This work was to be Dnyaneshwar's last as he soon announced his intention to take on the state of a Sanjeevan Samadhi.

== See also ==
- Jñānēśvarī
