= Alandi =

Alandi Aalankapuri
- Town
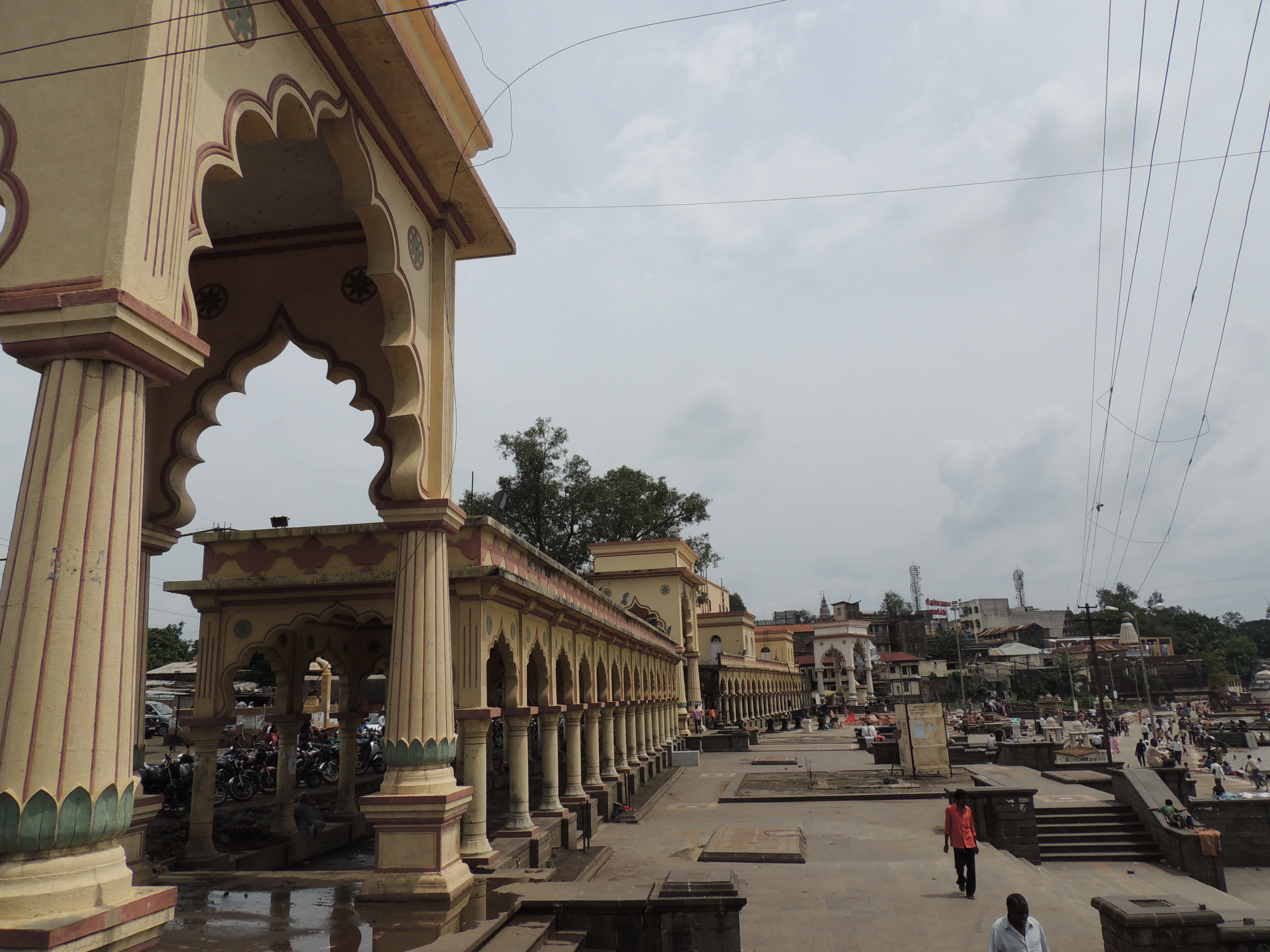
- The ghat at Alandi on the Indrayani river
- Nickname: Alandi
- Location of Alandi in Maharashtra, India Alandi (India)
- Coordinates: 18.677°N 73.897°E
- Country: India
- State: Maharashtra
- District: Pune

Government
  - Type: Municipal Council
  - Body: BJP
- Elevation: 577 m (1,893 ft)

Population (2011)
  - Total: 28,576

Languages
  - Official: Marathi
- Time zone: UTC+5:30 (IST)
- PIN: 412105 412201
- Vehicle registration: MH 14

Alandi (Marathi pronunciation: [aːɭən̪d̪iː]) is a town and a municipal council in the Pune district in the state of Maharashtra, India. The town is popular as a place of pilgrimage and for being the resting place of the 13th century Marathi saint Sant Dnyaneshwar.

== History ==
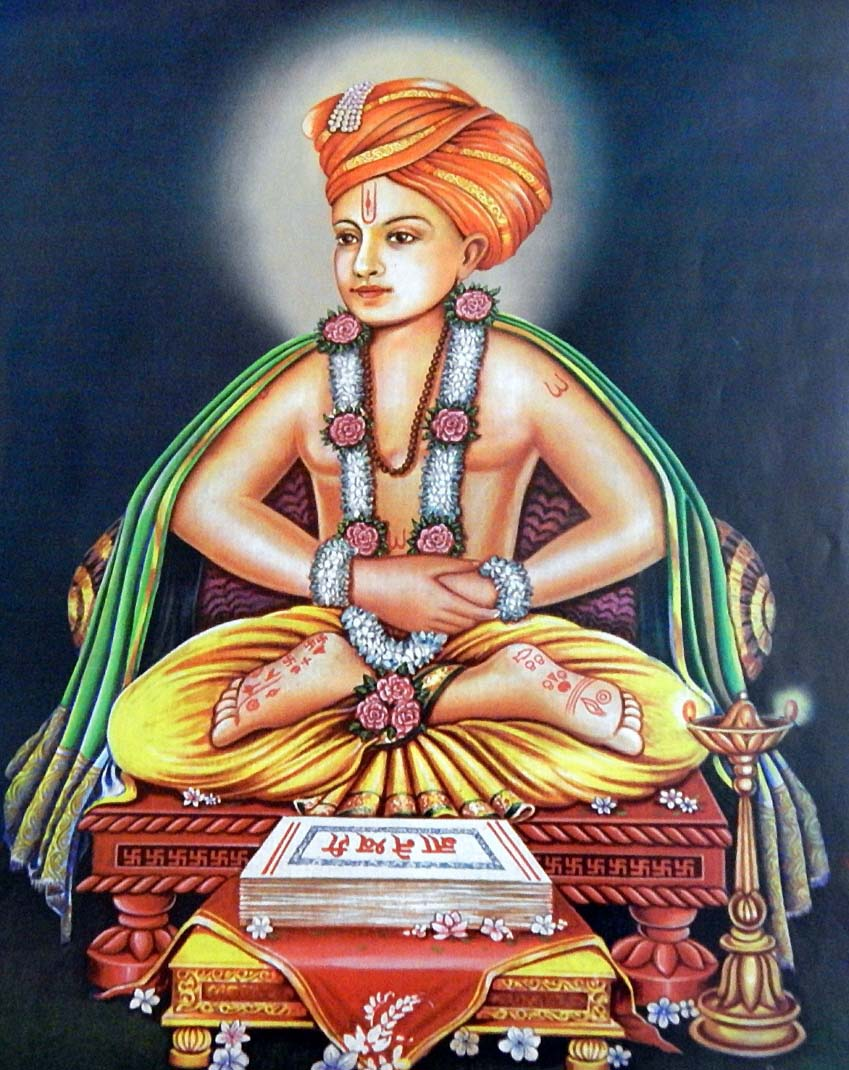
Dnyaneshwar

Alandi has a long history but gained prominence in the 13th century when Dnyaneshwar (1275–1296) decided to entomb, otherwise known as sanjeevan samadhi, himself in a samadhi, a form of shrine, under the then existing Siddheshwar temple complex in 1296. A temple was built over the Samadhi by Ambekar Deshpande in around 1580–1600. Further additions to the temple were made during the Maratha Empire era by Maratha nobles and the Peshwa. In 1778, Alandi was granted to Mahadji Shinde, the powerful Maratha statesman of the Maratha confederacy at that time, by the Peshwa. For two decades after that, the Shinde family were the main sponsors of various renovations of the temple.

In the 1820s, Haibatrao Buva Arphalkar Pawar, a courtier of the Scindia of Gwalior, started the modern Palkhi tradition of carrying the paduka (replica silver sandals) of Dnyaneshwar to Pandharpur during the annual Wari. Haibatraobuva was laid to rest under the first step of the temple complex per his will.

Despite being a small town, it was granted municipal status during the early British Raj. The council would raise revenue through levying a tax on pilgrims which used to number around 50,000 at the end of 19th century.

== Geography ==
Alandi (18°40′37.42″N 73°53′47.76″E) is located on the bank of the Indrayani River, 18.8 km (11.7 mi) from Khed Taluka of Pune District, near the northern edge of the city of Pune. Alandi has an average elevation of 577 meters (1,893 feet).

== Demographics ==
In 2011, Alandi had a population of 28,576. Males constitute 56% of the population and females 44%. The lingua franca is Marathi. Alandi has an average literacy rate of 73% (82% of the males, 68% of females), which is lower than the national average of 74.04%. 13% of the population is under 6 years of age. All castes are represented in the town census. The closely related Maratha clans, Kurhade-Patil and Ghundare-Patil, dominate the civic life of the town.

Traditionally, many Hindu widows have come to reside in places of pilgrimage such as Pandharpur and Alandi.

== Government ==
Alandi has a Municipal council with a directly elected as Mayor (Nagaradhyaksha). In the 2016 election to the council, The BJP candidate Vaijayanti Umergekar-Kamble was elected mayor by defeating the Shiv sena candidate, Bhagyashree Randhwe. The BJP holds majority in the 18 member town council.

Alandi comes under the Pune district sub-division of Khed taluka. It is a part of Maharashtra Legislative Assembly constituency of Khed Alandi which in turn belongs to Shirur parliamentary constituency. since 2024 Vidhansabha elections, the assembly seat is held by Babaji Kale of Shiv Sena (UBT).

== Pilgrimage center ==
=== Dnyaneshwar samadhi ===
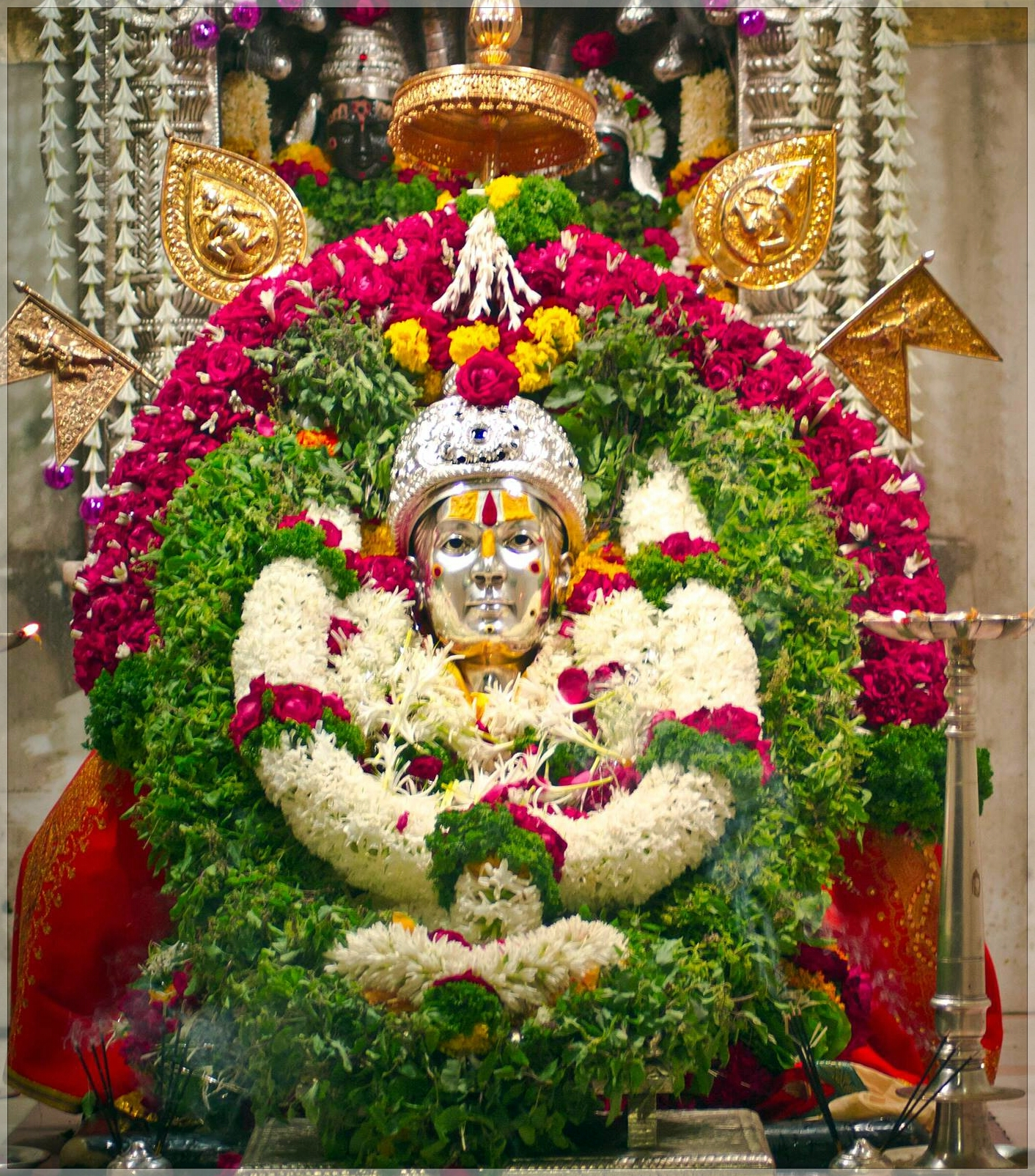
Samadhi of Dnyaneshwar with idols of Vitthal and Rukmini at the back

Alandi is a well known place of pilgrimage for Hindu Marathi people because of the town's association with Dnyaneshwar. His devotees believe that he is still alive. A temple complex was built at Dnyaneshwar's samadhi and is visited by pilgrims, especially those of the Varkari sect. The Ekadashi of the dark half of each month attracts 60–70 thousand pilgrims to the town.

=== Pandharpur vari ===
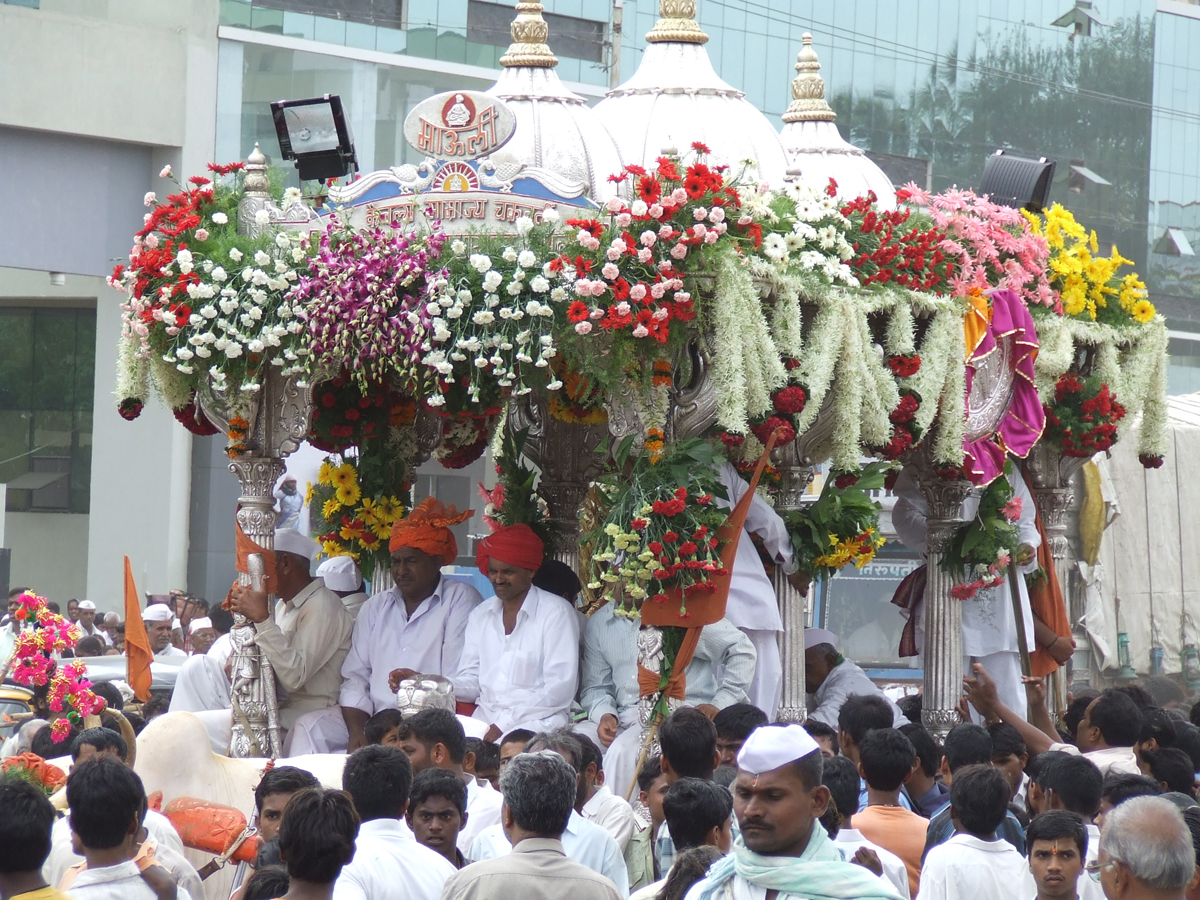
Sandals (paduka) of Sant Dnyaneshwar being carried in a palkhi on their way from Alandi to Pandharpur on the annual pilgrimage (Pandharpur vari)

Every year, the Paduka (symbolic sandals) of Dnyaneshwar go on a 21-day Palkhi from Alandi to reach Pandharpur on Ashadhi Ekadashi (June or July in the Gregorian calendar). The Palkhi procession is joined by hundreds of thousand of Varkari devotees for the 223 km journey.

=== Kartik Festival ===
The biggest festival in Alandi is held every year on Kartika Vadya Ekadashi (the eleventh day of the dark fortnight of the Hindu month of Kartik in the Shalivana Shaka calendar). The festival falls close to the day Dnyaneshwar entered Samadhi. This festival or yatra is attended by pilgrims and has a significant economic impact for the local population.

=== Indrayani river ===
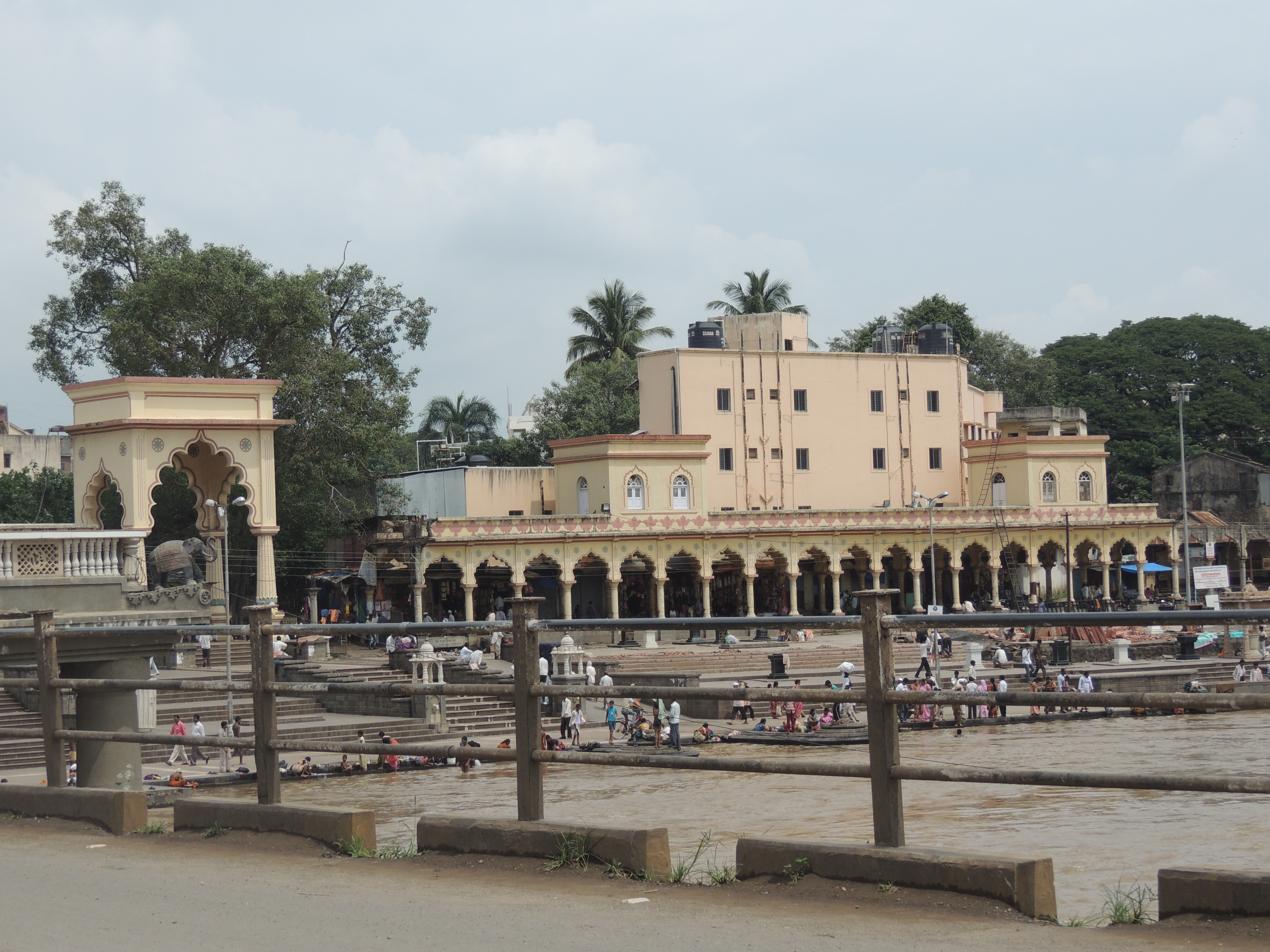
Bathing ghat on the Indrayani river

Bathing in the Indrayani River has special significance for pilgrims to Alandi. However, the river is heavily polluted because of sewage discharge by towns along its course and contains high amount of Fecal coliform.

Being a pilgrim center, the stretch of Indrayani River at Alandi, by tradition, has been designated a sanctuary and no fishing takes place. This acts as a sanctuary for river fish such as the Deccan Mahseer.

Pilgrims perform Parikrama around the town during their visit.

=== Other places of religious significance ===
The places of interest to pilgrims in and around Alandi include:

- The Dnyaneshwar Samadhi Complex that includes the Samadhi, the Shri Sidheshwar temple and the famed Ajanvriksha tree.
- The ghats on the banks of the Indrayani river. Many people bring ashes of their relatives to be ceremoniously immersed in the river at the ghat.
- Ram Mandir, near the banks of the Indrayani River, south of the Samadhi mandir, is one of the many large temples in Alandi.
- Laxmi Narayan Mandir – is located South to Samadhi mandir, adjacent to Ram mandir, near the River ghat.
- The Vitthal-Rukmini Temple.
- Dnyaneshwari Mandir – a modern multi story temple of the Govind Maharaj organization.
- Narsimha Saraswati Math – west of Dnyaneshwar Samadhi Complex en route to the Dnyaneshwari Mandir.
- Shree Gajanan Maharaj Temple complex, south of the Dnyaneshwar Samadhi Complex
- Dnyaneshwar's Wall – according to legend when the Sant Changdev came to visit Dnyaneshwar on a tiger with a snake as a whip, Dnyaneshwar and his siblings went to meet him riding on a wall that moved.
- Sant Jalaram Temple: This temple was built in the 1960s with the same architectural design as the one in Virpur, Gujarat. There is also a temple of Santoshi Mata in the same temple complex.
- The town has a number of Ved Shalas that offer study of the Vedas.
- Purushartha Aniruddha Dham: It hosts the consecration of goddess Jagadamba (Mahishasurmardini) making it a significant spiritual complex for devotees across Maharashtra and beyond. The Dham houses a Meditation Hall where devotees may meditate, offer prayers and chant.

=== Nearby places of historical and religious significance ===
- Sambhaji Raje Bhosle Memorial: in Tulapur village, approximately 6 km from Alandi. A memorial to the son of Chhatrapati Shivaji and the second Chhatrapati of Maratha Empire.
- Dehu: the birth, work and worship place of Sant Tukaram and from where the Sant Tukaram flew to Vaikuntha on eagle.

=== Accommodation ===
The town has dozens of dharmshalas that provide lodgings to pilgrims from their respective communities such as the Padmashali or Maheshwari. A number of these places also have their own shrines to different deities and Varkari Sants.

== Economy ==
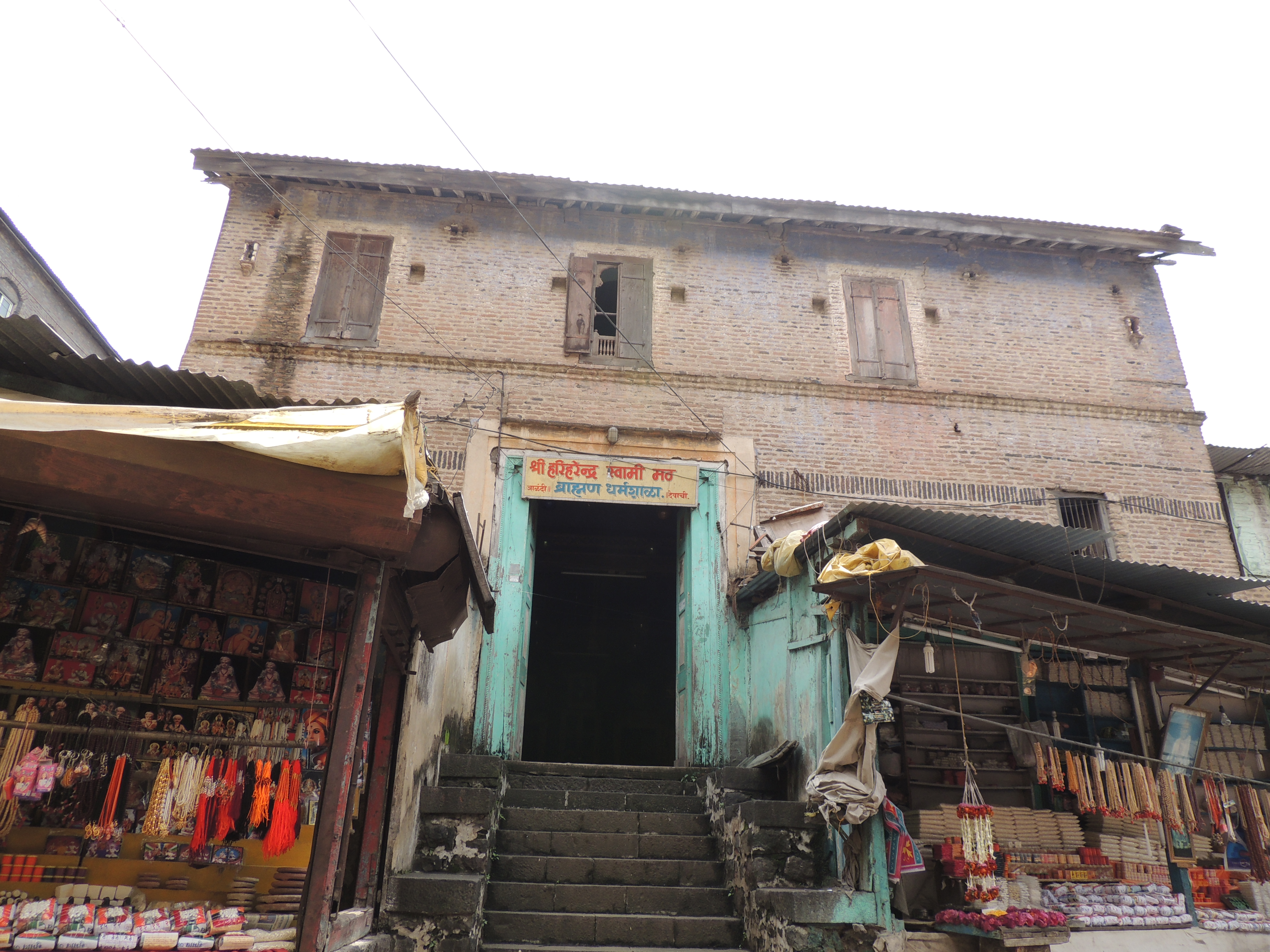
Shops in Alandi selling religious items and memorabilia for pilgrims

=== Pilgrim services ===
The economy of Alandi was historically based around its status as a place of pilgrimage. Although the major festivals in the town are held only twice a year, pilgrims from all over Maharashtra visit the place throughout the year. The needs of the pilgrims are catered for by groups of Brahmins who officiate at the samadhi, weddings, or religious services to the bereaved. Vendors outside the main temple complex offer goods, such as garlands and turmeric, for worshipping at the samadhi along with religious souvenirs and books. Marathi Hindu castes such as the Padmashali have built Dharmashalas (Pilgrim rest houses) that offer accommodation to pilgrims from their castes. The temple's two main festivals occur in Shaka month of Jyeshtha (late June - early July), when the Dnyaneshwar's palkhi departs for the Pandharpur Wari, and in the second half of the Shaka month of Kartik (November). During these festivals, a significant percentage of local population earns income by offering accommodation, catering and other services to the pilgrims. However, a significant number residents also have negative feelings about these festivals. The local Municipal council also collects pilgrim or goods tax for public health provision. A report for Pune metropolitan area in 1991 stated that because of religious nature of the place, industry will not be allowed in Alandi.

=== Wedding venue ===
Alandi is a popular wedding venue. During the Hindu wedding season, around 300-400 marriages take place daily. The weddings attract about 50-75,000 visitors per year. The numerous dharmashala in the town serve as the venues for the wedding ceremony.

== Public health and the Environment ==
As a major pilgrimage center, Alandi receives millions of visitors per annum. However, the town does not have proper underground drainage system. The open storm water drains carry both the storm water and untreated sewerage to the Indrayani river. Studies show that the river is highly polluted at Alandi due to local factors as well as due to activities upstream.

The town also suffers from noise pollution due to the cultural and religious activities. Although the use of loudspeakers is prohibited after 10:00pm in urban areas, temples are exempted. The temple activities start by dawn for various prayers such as Bhajan, and Kirtan and continue until midnight with public address system. The numerous wedding ceremonies also add to noise pollution. A study performed at different locations in the town revealed noise levels exceeding those set by the Central Pollution Control Board (the Indian federal authority addressing pollution related issues).

== Bibliography ==
- Bahirat, B.P. (1998). The philosophy of Jñānadeva : as gleaned from the Amṛtānubhava. Delhi: Motilal Banarsidass. p. 15. ISBN 978-8120815742.
- Glushkova, Irina (2014), Objects of Worship in South Asian Religions: Forms, Practices and Meanings, Routledge, ISBN 978-1-317-67595-2
- Dallmayr, Fred (2007), In Search of the Good Life: A Pedogogy for Troubled Times, University Press of Kentucky, ISBN 978-0-8131-3858-9
- Dr. Mahdev D Gurav. A Geographical Study of Fairs and Festivals in Pune District. Lulu.com. ISBN 978-1-387-13602-5.
