= Changdev Maharaj =

Indian mystic

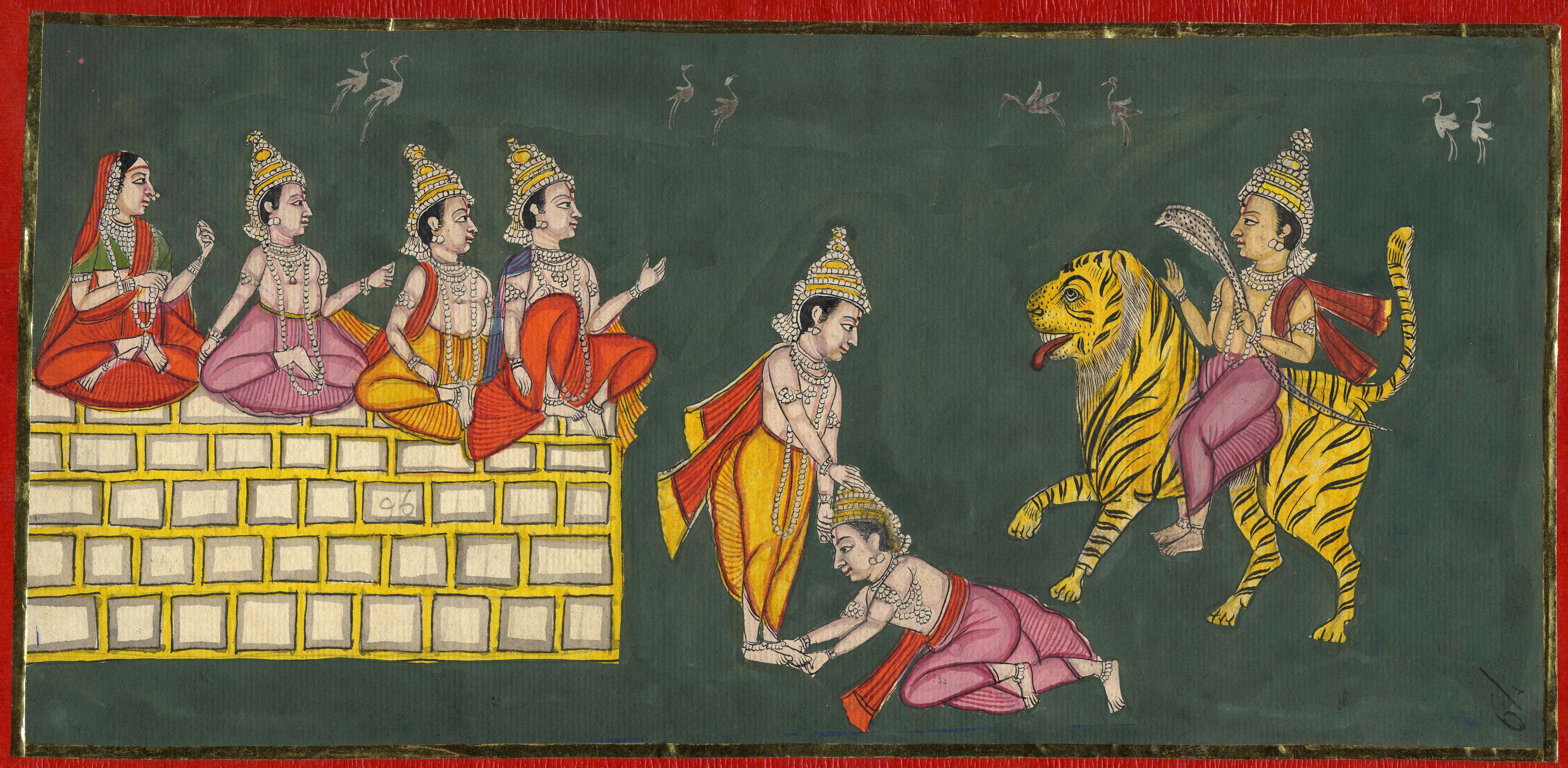
- The siblings Nivruttinath, Dnyaneshwar, Sopan and Muktabai seated on the moving wall, Changdev seated on a tiger. In the centre, Changdev bows down to Dnyaneshwar

Personal life
- Honors: Maharaj in Marathi

Religious life
- Religion: Hinduism

Changdev Maharaj (also commonly referenced in ancient texts as Changa Deva, Changadeva, or simply Changa) was a mystical yogi turned saint who is believed to have lived in the village of Vateshwar along the banks of the Tapti river for 1,400 years. Per popular belief, Changdev Maharaj achieved Bhuta Siddhi (control over the classical elements) based on his yogic powers and used these powers to perform various supernatural acts. Even though Changdev Maharaj himself is believed to have had held godly status and followers, his current following is mostly amongst Varkaris due to his association with Dnyaneshwar and Muktabai.

== Present-day Remains ==
Temples dedicated to Changdev Maharaj are today mostly found in the state of Maharashtra. References to his yogic and Tantric acts can be found in various literate related to yogic and Tantric streams as well as Buddhist folklore. The word Changa itself means good, and is also the name of a particular Shiva Jyotirlinga and the deity Bhairava

In the present day, the village of Changdev which is 12 kilometers away from Muktainagar which is present in Jalgaon district of Maharashtra, is located where river Purna joins river Tapi, where Changdev Maharaj is believed to have lived for 1,400 years. This village houses an old temple dedicated to him. It is believed that the temple is about 3,000 years old. It is currently an Archeological Survey of India protected monument.

The present day Puntamba, a village along the banks of the Godavari River in Maharashtra, is believed to be the 14th and final resting place for Changdev Maharaj. The village has a mid-17th-century temple which houses the samadhi of Changdev Maharaj.

Narayanpur, a village to the south of Pune at the foothills of Purandar Fort, is believed be the native village of Changdev. It is believed that this ancient village, referred to as Pur during the Yadava Dynasty's rule, was a prosperous town. At present, it houses a 700+ year-old Narayana temple. The temple, which is Hemadpanti style, has inscriptions on its wall which preach teachings of Changdev Maharaj.

Even though not a temple by itself, the masonry wall used by Dnyaneshwar as a steed to visit Changdev (see below) is a sacred monument and is worshipped by the Varkaris visiting the holy town of Alandi.

== Dnyanadev and the Flying Wall ==
Changdev is most commonly known today due to his popular first encounter with Dnyaneshwar, also known as Dnyanadev. As the story goes, when the four siblings of Nivruttinath, Dnyaneshwar, Sopan and Muktabai achieved glory, Changdev Maharaj wanted to test them, and hence sent them a blank note. When the siblings received this note, they laughed at the gesture and on Nivritti’s asking, Dnyaneshwar wrote 65 verses which were the quintessence of Vedanta on it. When the paper reached Changdev Maharaj, he had difficulty understanding what was written, and decided to meet the siblings to show them his yogic powers in person. For this visit he chose to ride on back of a tiger, wielding a poisonous cobra as a whip. When the siblings, then sitting on a masonry wall, saw the procession of Changdev Maharaj and thousands of his devotees walking toward their house, they decided to break his pride by humiliating him. They patted on the wall and it rose up to fly in the air. This use of an inanimate wall as a vehicle amazed everyone present. Changdev realized the greatness of these children. He became one of their disciples and overcame his pride and ego. These verses sent by Dnyaneshwar later became known as Changdev Pasashti (Pasasht means 65 in Marathi) and are one of the holy scriptures amongst followers of Dnyaneshwar.

== Muktai, the spiritual guide ==
Muktai, the sister of Dnyaneshwar, is believed to be the spiritual guide of Changdev Maharaj. As the legend goes, once Muktai and her brothers were sitting in the ashram when Changdev happened to pass by. Muktai was of course fully clad, but she appeared to Changdev as unclad and at once he turned away. Muktai then told him that he was not perfect as he still had a complex of sex and shame, and did not see God in every being. These words of Muktai had great effect on him and he eradicated this weakness through intense sadhana. Changdev wished to make Dnyanadev his guru, but Dnyanadev said that Muktai was the right spiritual guru instead of himself. From this point on, Changdev took Muktai as his spiritual guide, and many references to Muktai can be found in the Abhangs that he wrote.

== Legends associated with Changdev Maharaj ==
- Changdev Baba followed the path of Non-Duality in the Nath-Panth order. He followed Lord Adinath (who is said to be an incarnation of Lord Para Shiva).
- Changdev Maharaj was a Mahayogi who lived in his mortal coil for 1400 years. He had complete knowledge of and control over all the five elements (water, air, fire, earth, and ether).
- By his yogic powers, he gathered light and formed a real Jyotirlinga which he worshiped as Jyotir Shiva. He was also an occultist and used to worship Mahabhairav in the Jyotir Shiva Linga manifested by him.
- By his yogic powers, he resurrected many dead people back to life.
