= Abhang =

Form of Hindu devotional poetry

Abhanga is a form of devotional poetry sung in praise of the Hindu god Vitthal, also known as Vithoba. The word "abhang" comes from a for "non-" and bhanga for "ending" or "interrupting", in other words, a flawless, continuous process, in this case referring to a poem. By contrast, the devotional songs known as Bhajans focus on the inward journey. Abhangs are more exuberant expressions of the communitarian experience. Abhanga is considered a form of the ovi. Abhangs are sung during pilgrimage to the temples of Pandharpur, by the devotees.

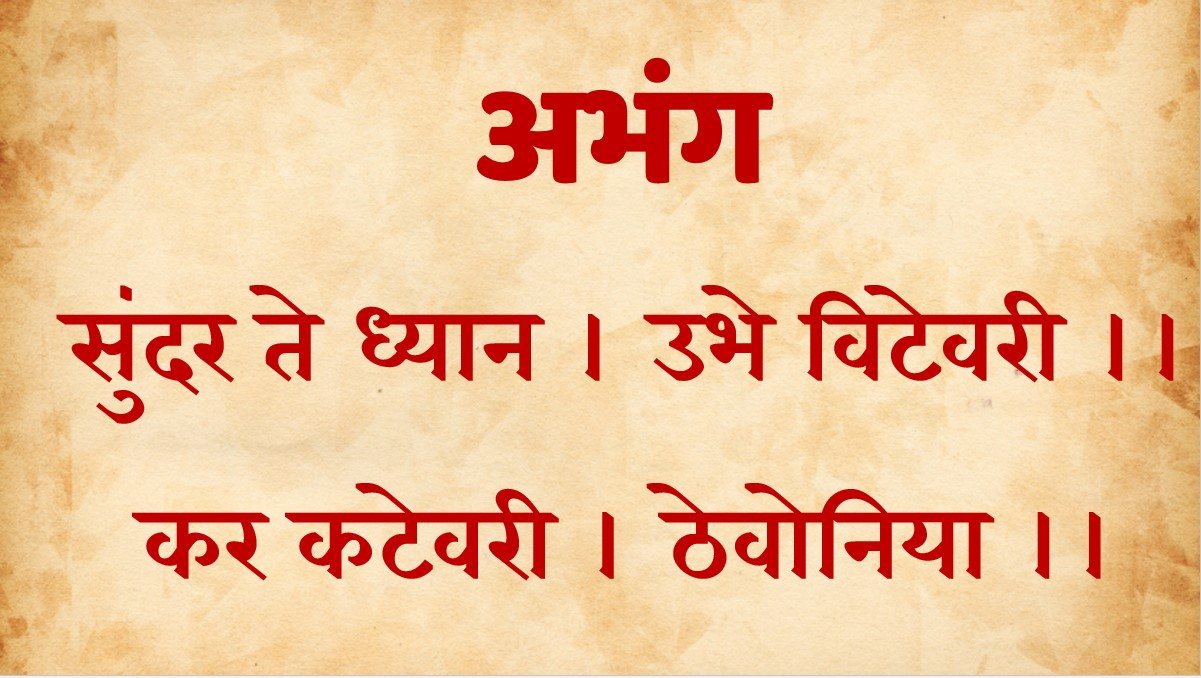
Abhang

== Practise ==
Marathi bhajans start with the naman (invocation of god), followed by the Roopancha Abhang (Portraying the physical beauty of god by personifying in the human form) and towards the end of the bhajan, spiritual and ethical messages are sung.

Some famous musicians for Abhangs are Bhimsen Joshi, Kishori Amonkar, Sudhir Phadke, Suresh Wadkar, Ranjani, Gayatri, Aruna Sairam and Jitendra Abhisheki. It is a form of music performed by both classical and non-classical musicians.

It has become integral in Bhajan concerts across India.

== History ==
Bhakti Sampradaya or Namasankeerthana Sampradhaya was pioneered by Jñāneśvar around 1200. Around that time it was believed that Sanskrit was required to attain Godliness. Both Jñāneśvar and Namdev through their works, devotion and bhakti could initiate a sampradaya that did not attach importance to caste or creed but only devotion to Panduranga. This was the birth of "Bhakti Sampradaya" wherein it was possible to attain Godliness merely through Bhakti(devotion). This could be easily adopted and practised by the masses. Women and children were easily attracted to this new form of worship. Thus was born the Namasankirtana cult and Varkari Sampradaya. All these happened around places like Paithan, Pandharpur, Mangal Veda, Alandi and slowly spread to the entire Maharashtra. Other prominent singers were Varkari saints like Eknath and Tukaram.

Tukaram was a seventeenth century poet who lived in the town of Dehu, which is located near Pune. He was a popular poet and a leading figure in the Varkari Movement of the time, which sought to put the emphasis back on devotion and love towards God, in contrast to blind obedience of rituals and arcane religious practices. It is said that over 5000 Abhangas were written by Sant Tukaram. Many of them were devoted to the God Vitthal or Vithoba, but mostly criticized social injustices of the time.

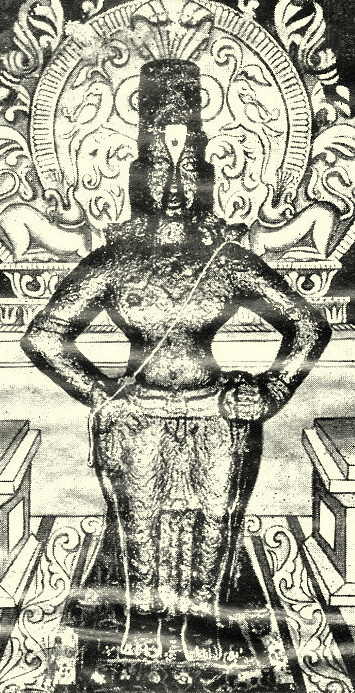
A picture of the Syambhu Vithoba idol at the Pandharpur Temple

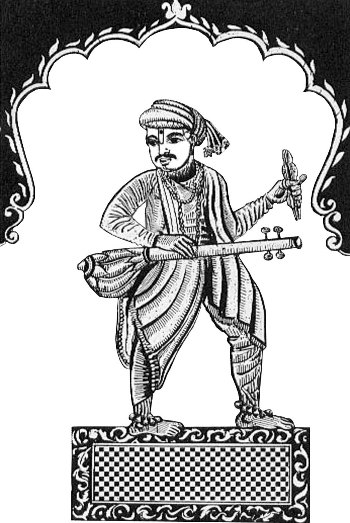
This is the oldest available image of Tukaram, 1832 A.D. It was a cover to a handwritten manuscript of Tukaram's abhangs belonging to a Varkari Haibatbaba Arphalkar

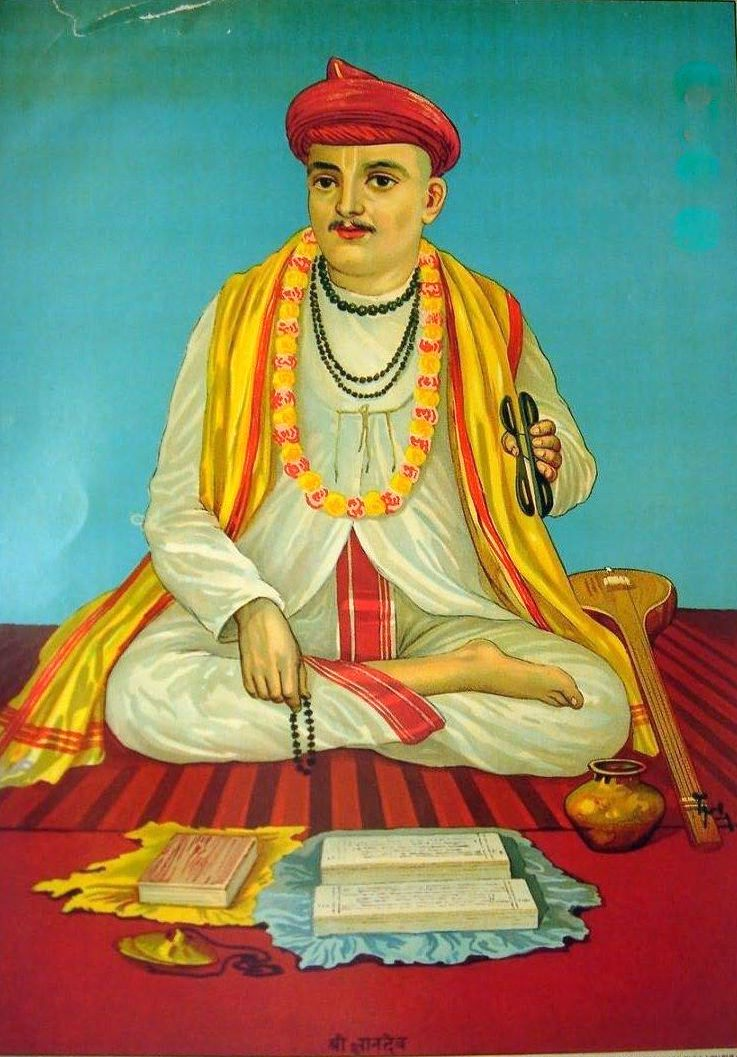
Sant Dnyaneshwar

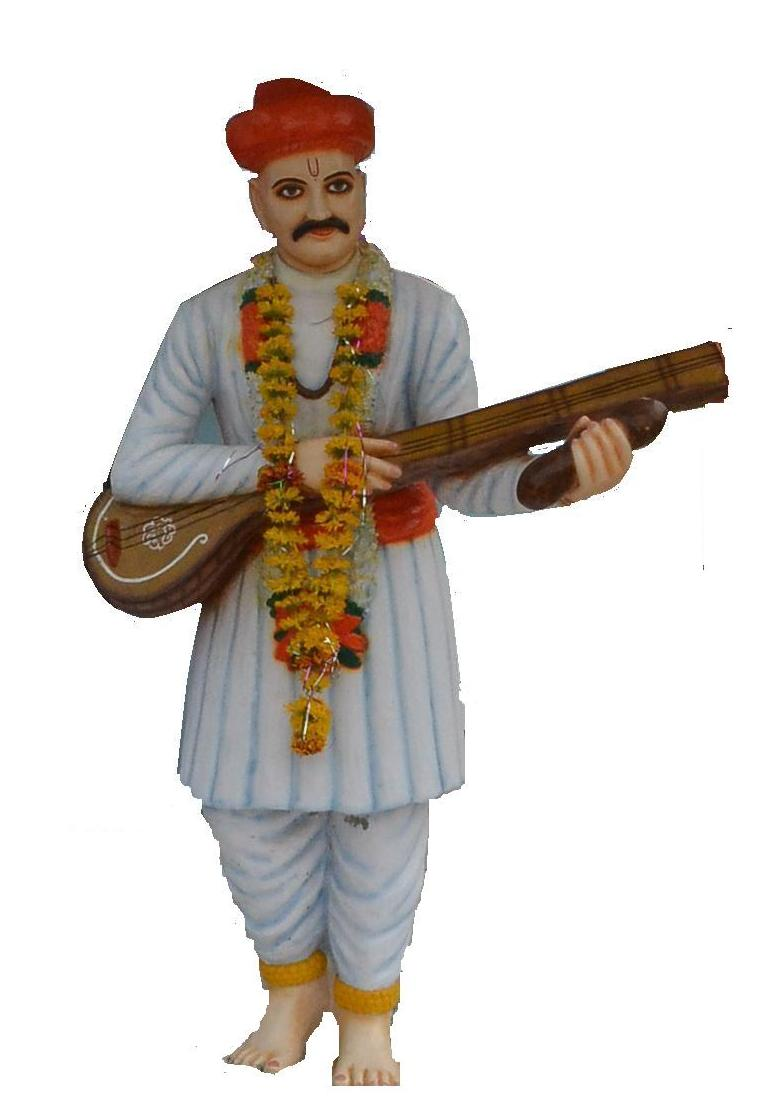
Namdev

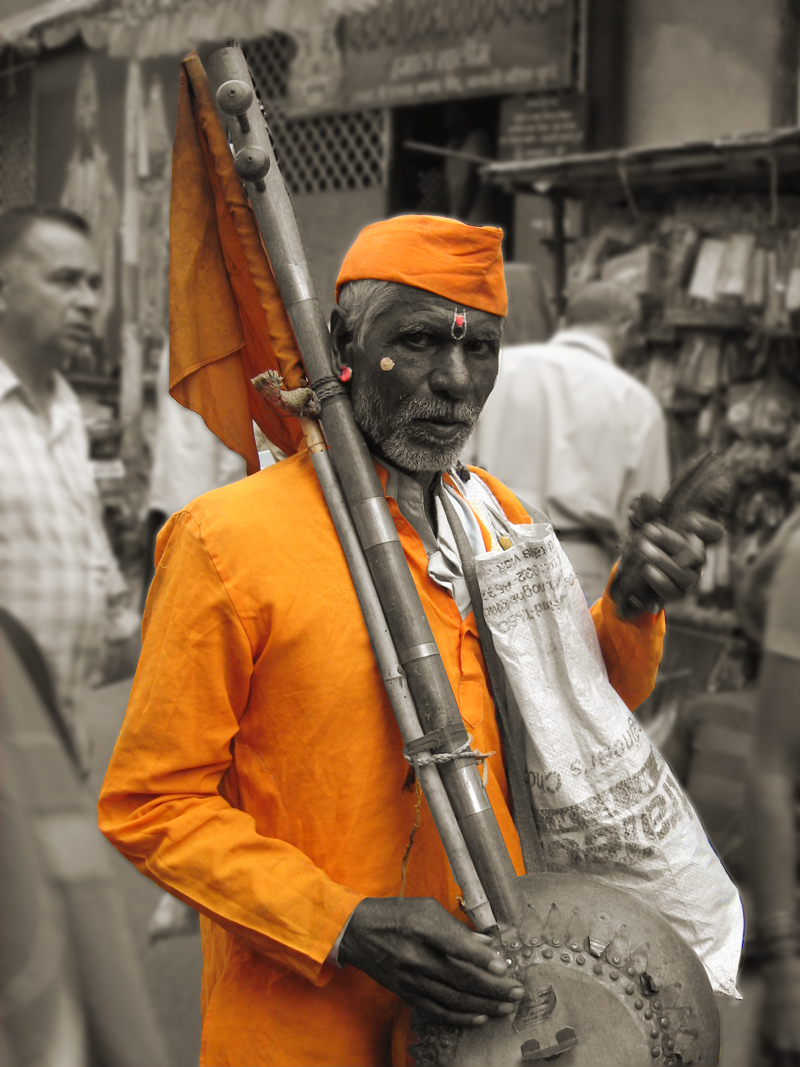
A Varkari journeys from Alandi to Pandharpur. He carries a veena (lute) with saffron flag attached, and cymbals tied to strings in his hands.
