= Varkari =

Krishnaite Vaishnava tradition

Vārkari Vaishnavism
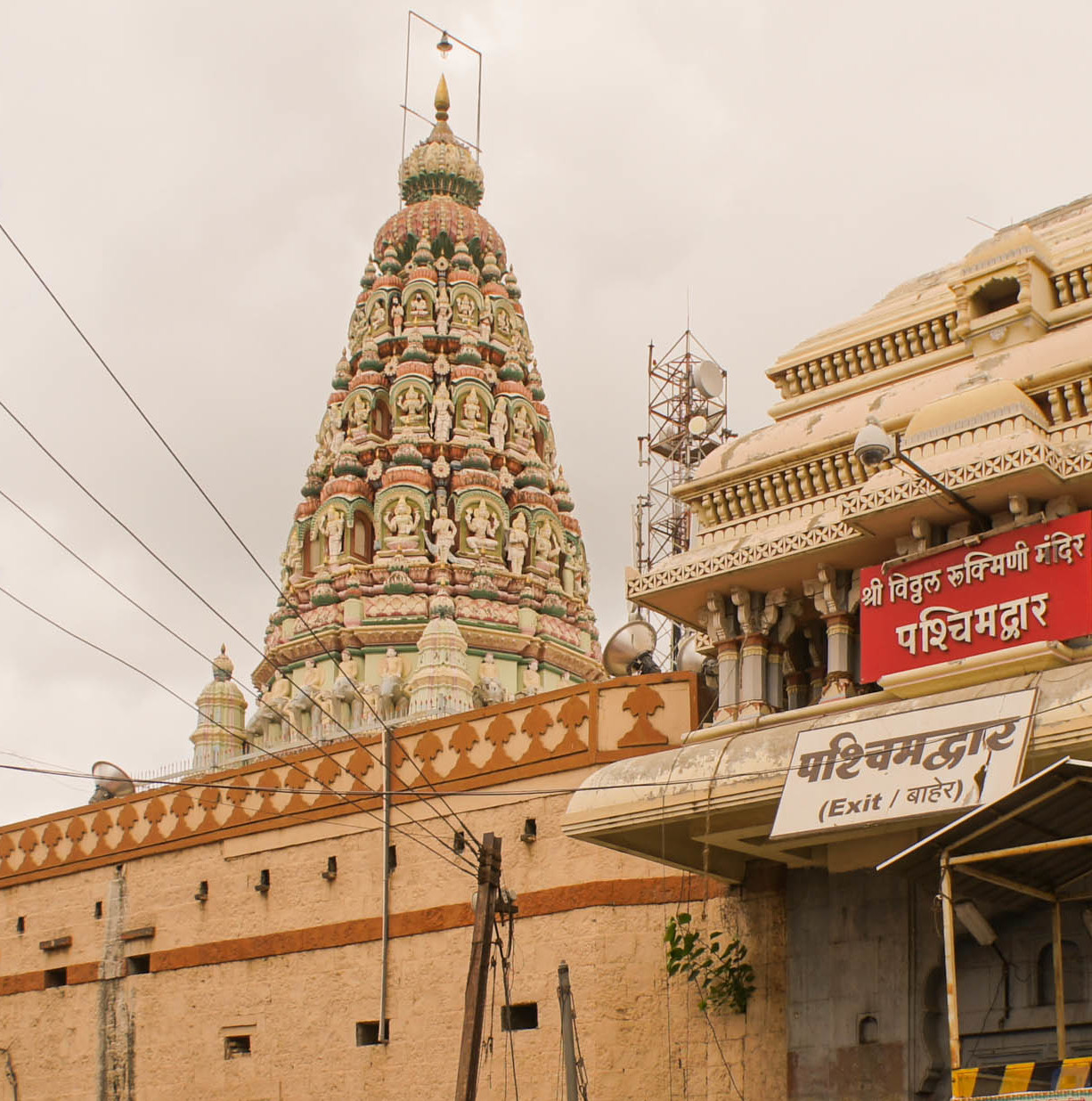
- The Vithoba Temple one of the 108 Abhimana Kshethram of Vaishnavate tradition

Regions with significant populations
- India

Religions
- Vaishnavism (Hinduism)

Scriptures
- Bhagavad Gita, Dnyaneshwari, Eknathi Bhagwat, Brahma Sutra, Pancharatra, Vedas, Upanishads

Languages
- Marathi, Sanskrit, Konkani

Vārkari (/wɑːrkəri/ VAR-kə-ree; Marathi: वारकरी; Pronunciation: Marathi pronunciation: [ʋaːɾkəɾiː]) meaning: 'The one who performs the Vari') is a sampradaya (religious movement) within Hinduism, geographically associated with the Indian state of Maharashtra. Varkaris worship Krishna as Vitthala (also known as Vithoba), the presiding deity of Pandharpur, regarded as a form of Vishnu, and his consort Rukmini as Rakhumai (also known as Rahi), regarded as a form of Lakshmi. Saints and gurus of the Bhakti movement associated with the tradition include Dnyaneshwar, Namdev, Chokhamela, Eknath, and Tukaram, all of whom are accorded the title of sant. The Varkaris acknowledge and accept the oneness of Vishnu with other deities like Shiva, Shakti, and Ganesha, building upon the principles of Advaita Vedanta.

== Influence ==
The Vārkari tradition has been part of Hindu culture in Maharashtra since the thirteenth-century CE, when it formed as a panth (community of people with shared spiritual beliefs and practices) during the Bhakti movement. Vārkari recognize around fifty poet-saints (sants) whose works over a period of 500 years were documented in an eighteenth-century hagiography by Mahipati. The Vārkari tradition regards these sants to have a common spiritual line of descent.

== Practices ==
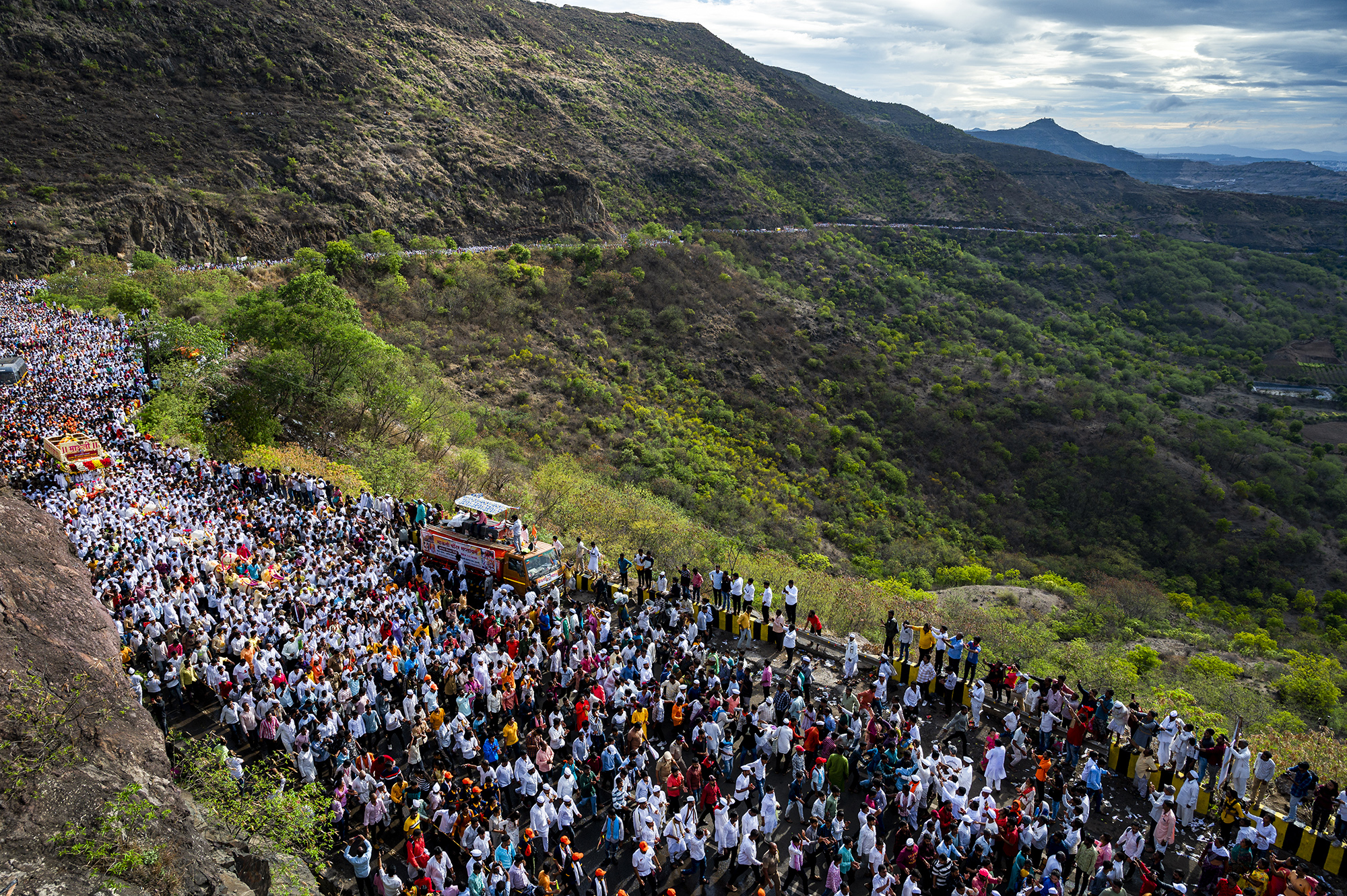
Thousands taking part in Ashadhi Vari (vārkari) an annual religious padayatra at Dive Ghat, Maharashtra, 2022

The Vārkari movement includes the worship of Krishna as Vitthala and a duty-based approach towards life emphasising moral behavior and strict avoidance of alcohol and tobacco, the adoption of sattvic diet, a modified lacto-vegetarian diet that excludes onion and garlic and fasting on the ekadashi day (twice a month), self-restraint (celibacy) during student life, equality and humanity for all rejecting discrimination based on the caste system, gender or wealth, the reading of Hindu texts, the recitation of the Haripath every day and the regular practice of bhajan and kirtan. The Varkaris wear a tulasi-mala, a rosary made from the wood of the sacred tulasi (Ocimum sanctum L.) plant. Varkari men may be known by their three upright brow lines, a black between two white gopichandan, or white clay, and sandal-paste lines which is also popular with other Vaishnava devotees. Varkaris look upon God as the Ultimate Truth and ascertained grades of values in social life but accept ultimate equality among men. Varkaris bow to each other because "Everyone has God's soul in them" and stress individual sacrifice, forgiveness, simplicity, peaceful co-existence, compassion, non-violence, love and humility in social life. The Vārkari poet-saints are known for their devotional lyrics, the abhanga, dedicated to Vithoba and composed in Marathi. Other devotional literature includes the Kannada hymns of the Haridasa, and Marathi versions of the generic aarti songs associated with rituals of offering light to the deity.

== Pilgrimages ==
Vārkaris undertake an annual pilgrimage called vari, to Pandharpur, gathering there on Ekadashi (the 11th day) of the Hindu lunar calendar month of Ashadha, corresponding to a date falling sometime between late June to July in the Gregorian calendar. Pilgrims carry Palkhi of the saints from their places of Samadhi (Enlightenment or "spiritual birth"). The tradition of carrying the paduka (sandals) of the sants in a Palkhi was started by the youngest son of Tukaram, Narayan, in 1685. Further changes were brought to the pilgrimage by descendants of Tukaram in the 1820s and by Haibatravbaba, a courtier of the Scindias and devotee of Vitthala.

Devotees of Vitthala have held pilgrimages as far back as the 14th century. In the present day, about 40 processions and their devotees from all over Maharashtra are undertaken. Another pilgrimage is celebrated on the ekadashi of the month of Kartika, which falls in November of the Gregorian Calendar.

Events such as Ringan and Dhava are held during the pilgrimage. During the Ringan, an unmounted sacred horse called Maulincha Ashva, who is believed to be the soul of the saint whose idol is being carried in the litter, runs through the rows of pilgrims, who try catching the dust particles kicked off and smear their head with the same. Dhava is another kind of race where everyone wins and it is held to commemorate the manner in which Tukaram first saw the temple at Pandharpur and started running in sheer exhilaration.

A traditional Varkari bhajan performed during Holi to worship the village deity
