= Eknath =

Indian Hindu saint, philosopher, and poet (1533–1600)

Ekanatha
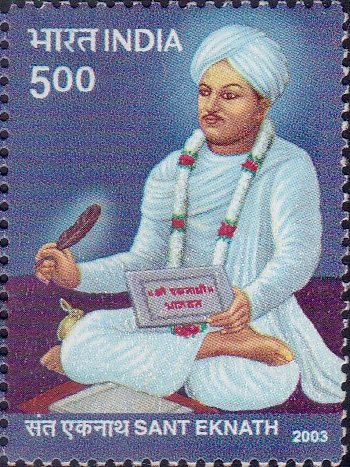
- Depiction of Ekanath on a 2003 stamp of India

Personal life
- Born: c. 1533 Paithan, Ahmadnagar Sultanate
- Died: 25 February 1600 (aged 66–67)
- Parents: Suryanarayana (father); Rukminibai (mother)
- Notable work(s): Ekanathi Bhagavata, Bhavartha Ramayana, Rukmini Swayamwar Hastamalak, Shukashtak, Swatma-Sukha, Ananda-Lahari, Chiranjeewa-Pad, Geeta-Saar and Prahlad-Vijaya
- Honors: Sant (Saint)

Religious life
- Religion: Hinduism
- Philosophy: Advaita Vedanta, Vaishnavism

Eknath (IAST: Eka-nātha, Marathi pronunciation: [eknath]) (c. 1533 – 25 February 1600), was an Indian Hindu Vaishnava saint, philosopher and poet. He was a devotee of Vitthal, a Hindu deity. He is a major figure of the Warkari tradition. He is often viewed as a spiritual successor to prominent Hindu Marathi saints Dnyaneshwar and Namdev.

== Biography ==
Historical information about his life is obscure. He is believed to have lived during the latter three-quarters of the 16th-century. He was born into a Deshastha Rigvedi Brahmin family of Vishwamitra gotra to Suryanarayan and Rukmini Bai at Paithan, a town in present-day Maharashtra. He was known to be an adherant of the Ashvalayana Sutra, a collection of Indian texts detailing domestic rituals for householders. His father held the title of Kulkarni and kept financial accounts. The ancestral family deity was Ekvira.

His parents died while Eknath was young. He was then raised by his grandfather, Chakrapani. His great-grandfather Bhanudas was another revered saint of the Warkari sect. Eknath was a disciple of Janardan Swami, who was a devotee of the Hindu deity Dattatreya. A samadhi or shrine venerating Eknath is located at Paithan, near the Godavari river. Celebrations commemorating Eknath are held every year around the month of March in Paithan.

== Literary contribution ==
Eknath's writings include a variation of the Hindu religious text Bhagavata Purana, known as Eknathi Bhagavata. He also wrote a variation of the Hindu epic Ramayana, also known as Bhavarth Ramayan. He also composed Rukmini Swayamwar Hastamalak, a literary piece consisting of 764 owee (poetic metre). It is based on a Sanskrit hymn of the same name. He also made attempts to shift the emphasis of Marathi literature from a spiritual to a narrative style of composition.

To assert the significance of the Marathi language, he once claimed the following:

If Sanskrit was made by God, was Prakrit born of thieves and knaves? Let these errings be of vanity alone. God is no partisan of tongues. To Him Prakrit and Sanskrit are alike. My language Marathi is worthy of expressing the highest sentiments and is rich, laden with the fruits of divine knowledge.

His other literary works include Shukashtak (447 owee), Sukha (510 owee), Ananda-Lahari (154 owee), Chiranjeewa-Pad (42 owee), Geeta-Saar and Prahlad-Vijaya. He introduced a new form of devotional melodies called Bharood and wrote nearly 300 of them.

He authored a short work known as "Hindu-Turk Samvad" that depicts a sixteenth-century conversation between a Hindu and a Muslim.

== Festival ==
Eknath Sashti is a festival held on the day on which the Eknath left his body in the River Godavari and took Jala samadhi at Paithan. The day occurs every year in Falgun (a Marathi month usually occurring in March or April).

== See also ==
- Vasudeva
- Bhagavatism
