= Kanhopatra =

15th-century Marathi saint-poet of the Hindu Varkari sect

Sant Kanhopatra
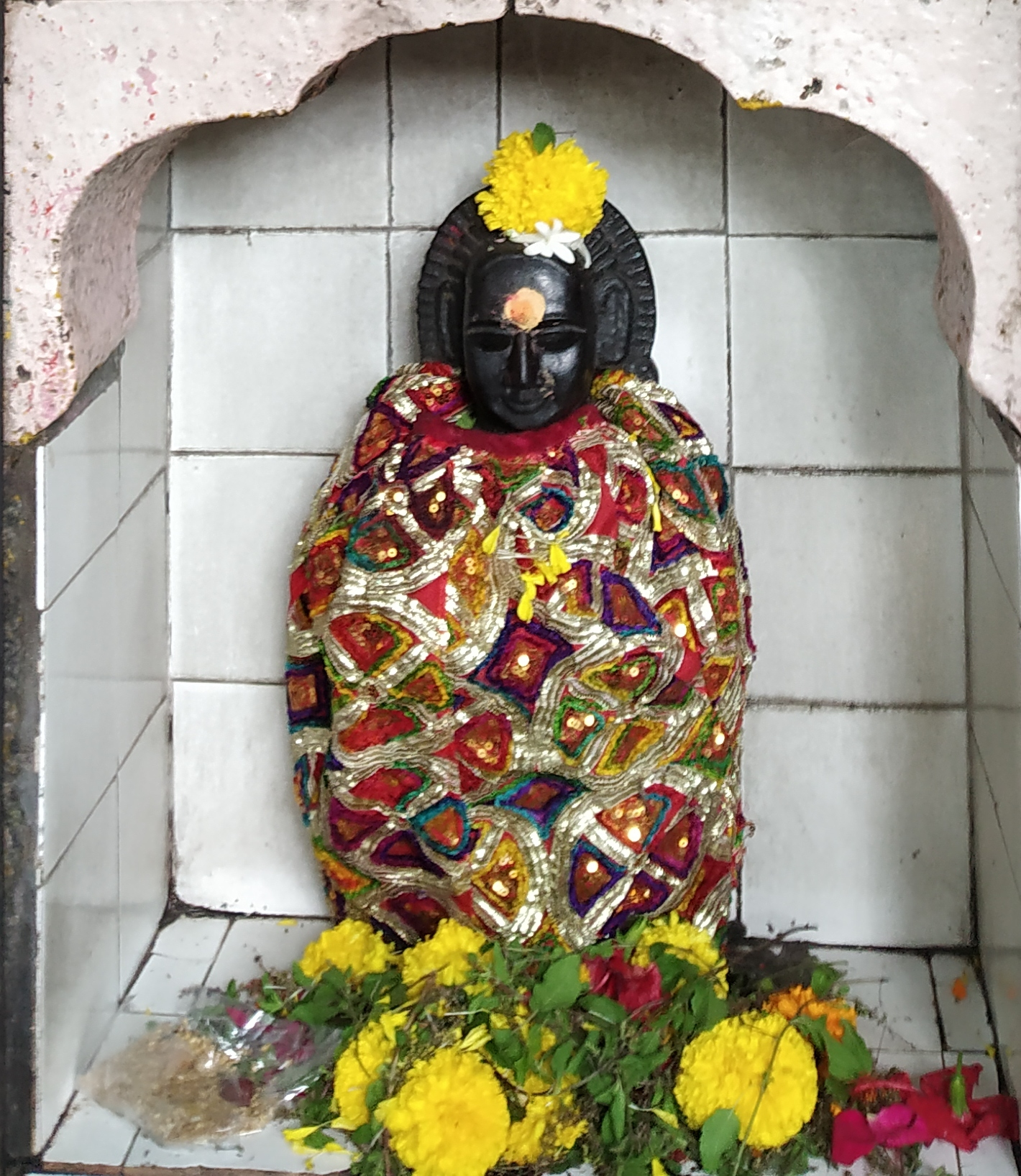
- Image of Kanhopatra in the Vithoba Temple, Pandharpur

Personal life
- Born: 15th century (exact date unknown) Mangalvedha, Maharashtra, India
- Died: 15th century (exact date unknown) Pandharpur, Maharashtra, India
- Notable work(s): Ovi and Abhanga devotional poetry
- Honors: Sant (संत) in Marathi, meaning "Saint"

Religious life
- Religion: Hinduism
- Philosophy: Varkari

Kanhopatra (or Kanhupatra) was a 15th-century Marathi saint-poet, venerated by the Varkari sect of Hinduism.

Little is known about Kanhopatra. According to most traditional accounts, Kanhopatra was a courtesan and dancer. These accounts typically concentrate on her death when she chose to surrender to the Hindu god Vithoba—the patron god of the Varkaris—rather than becoming a concubine of the Badshah (king) of Bidar. She died in the central shrine of Vithoba in Pandharpur. She is the only person whose samadhi (mausoleum) is within the precincts of the temple.

Kanhopatra wrote Marathi ovi and abhanga poetry telling of her devotion to Vithoba and her struggle to balance her piety with her profession. In her poetry, she implores Vithoba to be her saviour and release her from the clutches of her profession. About thirty of her abhangas have survived, and continue to be sung today. She is the only female Varkari saint to have attained sainthood based solely on her devotion, without the support of any guru, male Varkari saint, or parampara (tradition or lineage).

== Life ==
Kanhopatra's history is known through stories passed down over centuries. Most accounts agree about her birth to Shama the courtesan and her death in the Vithoba temple when the Badshah of Bidar sought her. However, the characters of Sadashiva Malagujar (her alleged father) and Hausa the maid do not appear in all accounts.

=== Early life ===
Kanhopatra sings to Vithoba

Kanhopatra was a daughter of a rich courtesan and dancer named Shama or Shyama, who lived in the town of Mangalvedha, near Pandharpur, the site of Vithoba's chief temple. Apart from Kanhopatra, Mangalwedhe is also the birthplace of the Varkari saints Chokhamela and Damaji. Shama was uncertain about the identity of Kanhopatra's father, but suspected that it was the town's head-man Sadashiva Malagujar. Kanhopatra spent her childhood in the palatial house of her mother, served by several maids, but because of her mother's profession, Kanhopatra's social status was demeaningly low.

Kanhopatra was trained in dance and song from early childhood so that she could join her mother's profession. She became a talented dancer and singer. Her beauty was compared to the apsara (heavenly nymph) Menaka. Shama suggested that Kanhopatra should visit the Badshah (Muslim king), who will adore her beauty and gift her money and jewelry, but Kanhopatra flatly refused. Traditional tales narrate that Shama wanted Kanhopatra to marry, but Kanhopatra longed to marry a man who was more beautiful than her. Scholar Tara Bhavalkar states that Kanhopatra's marriage was forbidden, as it was not socially acceptable for a daughter of a courtesan to marry.

Most accounts declare that Kanhopatra was forced into the courtesan's life, though she detested it, while some say that Kanhopatra firmly declined to become a courtesan. Some authors believe that she may have also worked as a prostitute.

=== Path to devotion ===
Sadashiva Malagujar, Kanhopatra's supposed father, heard of Kanhopatra's beauty and wished to see her dance, but Kanhopatra refused. Accordingly, Sadashiva started to harass Kanhopatra and Shama. Shama tried to convince him that he was the father of Kanhopatra and thus should spare them, but Sadashiva did not believe her. As he continued his harassment, Shama's wealth slowly depleted. Eventually, Shama apologised to Sadashiva and offered to present Kanhopatra to him. Kanhopatra, however, fled to Pandharpur disguised as a maid, with the help of her aged maid Hausa.

In some legends, Hausa—described as a Varkari—is credited for Kanhopatra's journey to devotion. Other accounts credit the Varkari pilgrims who passed Kanhopatra's house on their way to the temple of Vithoba in Pandharpur. According to one story, for example, she asked a passing Varkari about Vithoba. The Varkari said that Vithoba is "generous, wise, beautiful and perfect", his glory is beyond description and his beauty surpasses that of Lakshmi, the goddess of beauty. Kanhopatra further asked if Vithoba would accept her as a devotee. The Varkari assured her that Vithoba would accept her as he accepted the maid Kubja, (Note: In Hindu mythology, Kubja is described as a hunchback handmaid of the evil king Kamsa, who is prophesied to be killed by his nephew—god Krishna. Kubja welcomes Krishna (with whom god Vithoba is identified) in Mathura—the kingdom of Kamsa and anoints him with saffron and sandal, in return Krishna makes Kubja young and beautiful again. Kubja offers herself to Krishna and thus is accepted in spite of her low stature.) the sinful king Ajamila and the so-called "untouchable" saint Chokhamela. This assurance strengthened her resolve to go to Pandharpur. In versions of the legend where Sadashiva does not appear, Kanhopatra immediately leaves for Pandharpur—singing the praises of Vithoba—with the Varkari pilgrims or coaxes her mother to accompany her to Pandharpur.

When Kanhopatra first saw the Vithoba image of Pandharpur, she sang in an abhanga that her spiritual merit was fulfilled and she was blessed to have seen Vithoba's feet. She had found the unparalleled beauty she sought in her groom in Vithoba. She "wedded" herself to the god and settled in Pandharpur. She withdrew from society. Kanhopatra moved into a hut in Pandharpur with Hausa and lived an ascetic's life. She sang and danced at the Vithoba temple, and cleaned it twice a day. She gained the respect of the people, who believed her to be a poor farmer's daughter maddened by the love of Vithoba. In this period, Kanhopatra composed ovi poems dedicated to Vithoba.

=== Death ===
During this same time, however, Sadashiva—who felt insulted by Kanhopatra's refusal—sought the help of the Badshah (king) of Bidar. Hearing tales of Kanhopatra's beauty, the Badshah ordered her to be his concubine. When she refused, the king sent his men to get her by force. Kanhopatra took refuge in the Vithoba temple. The soldiers of the king besieged the temple and threatened to destroy it if Kanhopatra was not handed over to them. Kanhopatra requested a last meeting with Vithoba before being taken.

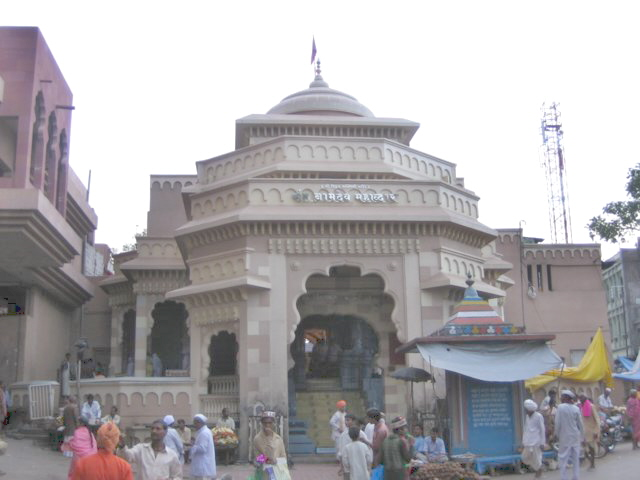
The chief gate of Vithoba temple, Pandharpur, where Kanhopatra's samadhi lies.

By all accounts, Kanhopatra then died at the feet of the Vithoba image, but the circumstances were unclear. According to popular tradition, Kanhopatra merged with the image of Vithoba in a form of marriage—something that Kanhopatra longed for. Other theories suggest that she killed herself, or that she was killed for her rebelliousness. Guy Deleury deduces from the poems of Namdev and other saints, that Kanhopatra did not die but acquired the power (siddhi) of invisibility by embracing Vithoba's image; after this yogic "miracle", the Badshah converted to bhakti.

Most accounts say that Kanhopatra's body was laid at feet of Vithoba and then buried near the southern part of the temple, in accordance with her last wishes. In some accounts, the nearby Bhima river (Chandrabhaga) flooded, inundating the temple and killing the army that sought Kanhopatra. The next day, her body was found near a rock. According to all versions of the legend, a tarati tree—which is worshipped by pilgrims in her remembrance—arose on the spot where Kanhopatra was buried. (Note: In the Bhaktivijaya by Mahipati (See Abott), the story continues even after Kanhopatra's death and burial. The priest of the temple was arrested for foul play. The priest was taken to the Badshah's court, where he gave the king a coconut – which has a hair. The hair is proclaimed by the priest as that of Vithoba. The Badshah then visited the Pandharpur temple to check the priest's claim, where Vithoba gave a divine vision to the king.) Kanhopatra is the only person whose samadhi (mausoleum) is in the precincts of the Vithoba temple. (Note: Kanhopatra is not the only person to die in the Pandharpur Vithoba temple, the saint-poet Namdev died on the first step of the main gate of the temple.)

=== Dating ===
Several historians have attempted to establish the dates of Kanhopatra's life and death. One estimate places her life circa 1428 CE by relating her to a Bahamani king of Bidar who is often associated with the Kanhopatra story—although in most accounts, that king is never explicitly named. Pawar estimates that she died in 1480. Others suggest dates of 1448, 1468 or 1470, or simply say that she lived in the 15th century—or in rare instances, the 13th or 16th century. According to Zelliot, she was a contemporary of saint-poets Chokhamela (14th century) and Namadeva (c.1270-c.1350).

== Literary works and teachings ==
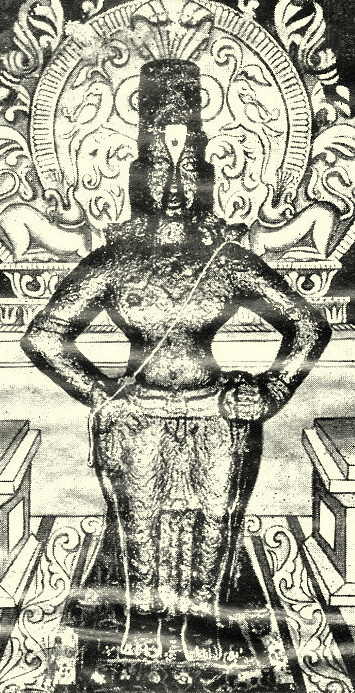
Kanhopatra's patron deity: Vithoba, the Pandharpur image at whose feet, Kanhopatra died.

Kanhopatra is believed to have composed many abhangas, but most were not in written form: only thirty of her abhangas or ovis survive today. Twenty-three verses of her poems are included in the anthology of Varkari saints called Sakal sant-gatha. Most of these verses are autobiographical, with an element of pathos. Her style is described as unadorned by poetic devices, easy to understand, and with a simplicity of expression. According to Deshpande, Kanhopatra's poetry reflects the "awakening of the downtrodden" and the rise of female creative expression, ignited by the sense of gender equality enforced by the Varkari tradition.

Kanhopatra's abhangas frequently portray her struggle between her profession and her devotion to Vithoba, the patron deity of the Varkaris. She presents herself as a woman deeply devoted to Vithoba, and pleads for him to save her from the unbearable bondage of her profession. Kanhopatra speaks of her humiliation and her banishment from society owing to her profession and social stature. She expresses disgust for the society which adored her as an object of beauty rather than as a human being, and abhorred her for profession. She describes how she has been the object of lustful thoughts. She worries that she was beyond the "scope of God's love". In Nako Devaraya Anta Aata—believed to be the last abhanga of her life—unable to bear the thought of separation from her Lord, Kanhopatra begs Vithoba to end her misery. In the abhanga Patita tu pavanahe, she acknowledges her Lord as the saviour of the fallen and asks him to save her as well:

O Narayana, you call yourself
savior of the fallen...
My caste is impure
I lack loving faith
my nature and actions are vile.
Fallen Kanhopatra
offers herself to your feet,
a challenge
to your claims of mercy.

Kanhopatra refers to Vithoba by names such as Narayana (a name of Vishnu, who is identified with Vithoba), Krishna (an incarnation of Vishnu, identified with Vithoba), Sripati ("husband of goddess Sri," an epithet of Vishnu) and Manmatha (a name of Kamadeva, the god of love, used by Vaishnava saints to describe Vishnu). She refers to Krishna-Vithoba as the "champion of the low", and as a mother. (Note: Kanhopatra is not unique in addressing Vithoba as mother, saint Janabai also refers to Vithoba as a mother. Other Varkari poet-saints refer to Vithoba mostly as a father. The suffix "ba" in Vithoba means "father". Kanhopatra refers to Krishna as Krishnai, Kanhai (Kanha is a name of Krishna) and Vithoba as Vithabai. The "aai" suffix in these words means "mother".) Kanhopatra also asserts the importance of repeating the names of God and reveals how chanting His names has helped her. She says that even Death would fear God's name, which purified the sinner king Ajamila – who ascended to heaven when he coincendentally called to God at his death bed, the "robber" Valmiki – who was transformed into a great sage by utterance of God's name – and even the prostitute Pingala. Kanhopatra says, she wears the garland of His names. She hoped that her chanting would ultimately lead her to salvation. Kanhopatra also extols the deeds of Dnyaneshwar—the first great saint of the Varkaris—and his siblings.

Kanhopatra's abhangas also show her concern for her body, her sense of vulnerability and her will to "remain untouched in the midst of turbulence". She compares herself to food being devoured by wild animals – an expression never used by male saints:

If you call yourself the Lord of the fallen,
why do O Lord not lift me up?
When I say I am yours alone,
who is to blame but yourself
if I am taken by another man.
When a jackal takes the share of the lion,
it is the great, who is put to shame.
Kanhopatra says, I offer my body at your feet,
protect it, at least for your title.

According to Ranade, this abhanga was composed by Kanhopatra when invited by the Bidar king.

Kanhopatra advises against seeking mere sexual pleasure; she speaks of the evils of sexual attraction, citing mythological characters who suffered the consequences of sexual temptation: the demon-king Ravana, the demon Bhasmasura, the god-king of heaven Indra and the moon-god Chandra. (Note: In the Hindu epic Ramayana, Ravana —the antagonist- kidnaps Sita and in the war that follows to regain Sita, Rama—the hero of the epic and husband of Sita—kills Ravana. The demon Bhasmasura has the power to reduce anyone to ashes by putting his hand on that person's head. He is deceived by Mohini, the seductress incarnation of Vishnu to put his own hand on his head and thus kill himself. The lord of heaven, Indra was cursed by sage Gautama Maharishi to have a thousand eyes (ulcers) all over his body, when he seduced Ahalya, the sage's wife, in the disguise of the sage. The moon-god Chandra was cursed to have dark spots on his face, when he kidnapped his teacher—god Brihaspati's wife Taraka and bore a son of her.)

== Legacy and remembrance ==
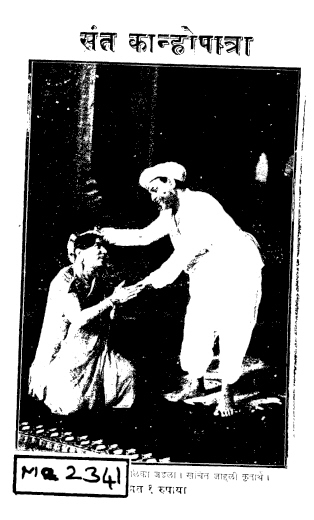
Script of the drama Sant Kanhopatra, depicting Bal Gandharva (left) as Kanhopatra

Kanhopatra is formally included in the list of Sants, meaning saints in Marathi in the text Bhaktavijaya. Mahipati (1715–1790), a traditional biographer of Marathi saints, devotes an entire chapter to her in his Bhaktavijaya extolling her devotion to Vithoba. In his Bhaktalilamrita Mahipati refers to Kanhopatra as one of the saints who sit surrounding Krishna (identified with Vithoba in Maharashtra). Kanhopatra is cited by the Vakari saint-poets as "an example of the real downtrodden and deserving people persons that are saved by the merciful God". In one of his abhangas, the Varkari saint and poet Tukaram (1577 – c.1650) uses the example of Kanhopatra and other famous saints who were low in the social caste hierarchy, to illustrate that caste is irrelevant when compared with devotion and merit. Her death and her surrender to Vithoba is regarded as a "great legacy of self respect combined with spiritualism." Kanhopatra is considered unique since she is the only prominent woman in Maharashtra who rose to fame without a traditional family backing. She was born in a household where devotion was unthinkable. She is the only woman Varkari saint, who is not associated with any male Varkari saint, (Note: Sant Muktabai was the sister of saint Dnyaneshwar. Sant Soyarabai and Sant Nirmala was the wife and sister of saint Chokhamela. Janabai was the maid-servant of saint Namdev. Sant Bahinabai was a student of saint Tukaram) who has no guru, nor any parampara (tradition or lineage). She is credited to have attained sainthood exclusively on the basis of her intense devotion to Vithoba, a devotion reflected in her abhangas.

Kanhopatra's life has been recounted in a 1937 Marathi film Kanhopatra (film) written and directed by Bhalji Pendharkar. She was also the subject of the popular 1931 Marathi drama named Sant Kanhopatra, in which Bal Gandharva played the lead. Kanhopatra's abhangas Aga Vaikunthichya Raya and Patita tu pavanahe; and Nako Devaraya Anta Aata are used in that drama and in the 1963 Marathi film Sadhi Manase respectively. A 2014 short film Katha Sant Kanhopatra by Sumeet video featured Pallavi Subhash as Kanhopatra.

Kanhopatra's abhangas are still sung in concerts and on radio, and by Varkaris on their annual pilgrimage to Pandharpur. The tree that rose at her burial spot in the Pandharpur temple is worshipped as her samadhi by devotees even today. A small shrine is also dedicated to her in her home town Mangalvedhe.

== Notes ==
Footnotes

Reference notes
