= Panduranga (disambiguation) =

Panduranga primarily refers to the Hindu deity Vithoba, an avatar of Vishnu, whose worship is centered in Pandharpur, Maharashtra, India.

It may also refer to:

- Panduranga (Champa), an ancient Cham kingdom in Vietnam
  - Principality of Thuận Thành, successor of Panduranga
  - Another name of Phan Rang, a region in Vietnam
- Panduranga (film), a 1939 Indian Telugu-language film about the deity
- Panduranga Hegde (fl. 1980s), Indian environmentalist

== See also ==
- Panduranga Mahatyam, a Sanskrit work in praise of the deity by the Indian poet Tenali Ramakrishna
  - Panduranga Mahatyam (film), a 1957 Indian film
- Pandurangadu, a 2008 Indian Telugu-language film
