= Visoba Khechara =

Indian Marathi saint in the Varkari tradition

Visoba Khechara (unknown - 1309 CE), spelled also as Visoba Khechar or Visoba Khecar, was the yogi-guru of the Varkari poet-saint Namdev (c.1270-1350) of Maharashtra, India. Visoba was a disciple of the Varkari poet-saint Jñāneśvar (c. 1275-1296). He had linkages with the Varkari tradition as well as the Nath tradition of Maharashtra. Though a staunch Shaiva, Visoba has composed verses in praise of the god Vithoba, the patron deity of the Varkari faith. He has also composed a metaphysical treatise called the Shatsthala.

== Etymology ==
The name Visoba is derived from the word viṣṇein, which means to relax and relates to the meeting of Visoba with Namdev. The latter part of the name Khechara (lit. "one who is moving in air") relates him being a Siddha, a Tantric master possessing magical powers and his linkage to the Nath tradition of Maharashtra. Another theory relates his name khechara, literally meaning a mule in Marathi, as the name Dnyaneshwar and Muktai called him in contempt, when Visoba refused to believe in their powers.

== Life ==
Visoba either lived in Amvadhya or Barshi. The story of Visoba's transformation is told in Mahipati's Bhaktivijay. In the text, Visoba's real name is said to be Visoba Chati. He is described as a Panchal Brahmin, who was jeweller by profession, and hated Jñāneśvar and his siblings and created obstacles in their path. Once, when Jñāneśvar's sister Muktabai went to get some earthenware from the potter, Visoba struck her angrily and disallowed the potter to sell her his pans. Disheartened, Muktabai returned home and told the tale to Jñāneśvar. The text says he heated his back by his yogic powers and Muktai baked the food on his back. Astonished by seeing this miracle, Visoba repented and asked for forgiveness from Jñāneśvar. Initially, Jñāneśvar calls Visoba "a mule", which gave him the name "Visoba Khechara". Visoba had refused to acknowledge Jñāneśvar and Muktabai, but after knowing their spiritual greatness he became their disciple. Even though older than Jñāneśvar, he is described as his servant ("Kimkara") by Bahinabai.

According to the text Dnyandev Gatha, Jñāneśvar and Muktabai instructed Namdev to journey to Aundha Nagnath Temple in search of a proper guru. In the temple, Namdev finds Visoba resting with his feet on the sacred lingam, the symbol of Shiva. Namdev reproached him for having insulted Shiva. Visoba asked Namdev to place his feet elsewhere, wherever Namdev placed Visoba's feet a Linga sprang up. Thus, through his yogic powers, Visoba filled the whole temple with Shiva-lingas and taught Namdev the omnipresence of God. Other texts which record Visoba as the guru of Namdev are the Guru Granth Sahib of Sikhism. Some texts call him Visoba Khecharnath Nathpanthi, linking him to the Nath tradition.

He also accompanied Jñāneśvar and Namdev on their pilgrimages. He died in Barshi on Shravana Shuddha Ekadashi, the 11th lunar day in the fortnight of the waxing moon in the Hindu month Shravana, in 1309.

== Teachings and literary works ==
Visoba denounced idol-worship and advises Namdev to not worship God as a stone image. He says:

A stone god never speaks. What is the possibility then of his removing the disease of mundane existence? A stone image is regarded as God but true God is wholly different. If a stone god fulfils desires, how is it that he breaks when struck? Those who adore a god made of stone, lose everything through their folly. Those who speak and hear that a god of stone speaks to his devotees are both of them fools. Whether a holy place is small or large there is no god but stone or water. There is no place which is devoid of God. That God has shown Nama (Namdev) in his heart and thus Khecar (Visoba) confers a blessing on him.

Visoba wrote abhangs in praise of the god Vithoba, the patron-deity of the Varkari tradition. The Jñāndev Gātha also mentions Khechara as playing at the Gopal-kala festival in the Pandharpur where Vithoba's chief temple is located along with the brothers Jñāneśvar, Nivruttinath and Sopan. This also suggests Visoba being a devotee of Vithoba. Visoba has also written a manuscript called Satsthal.
