= Sena Nhavi =

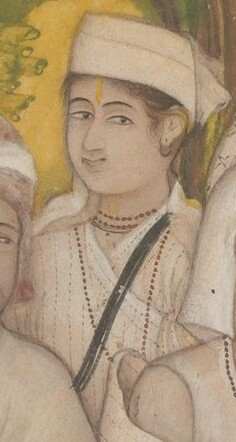
- Detail of Bhagat Sena from a painting of a gathering of holy men of different faiths, by Mir Kalan Khan, ca.1770–75

Religious life
- Religion: Hinduism
- Sect: Varkari

Sena Nhavi (literally Sena the barber, a name often used in English sources), also known as Saint Sena, and Sena, is a Hindu saint-poet (sant-kavi) of the Varkari sect dedicated to the god Vithoba.

== Life ==
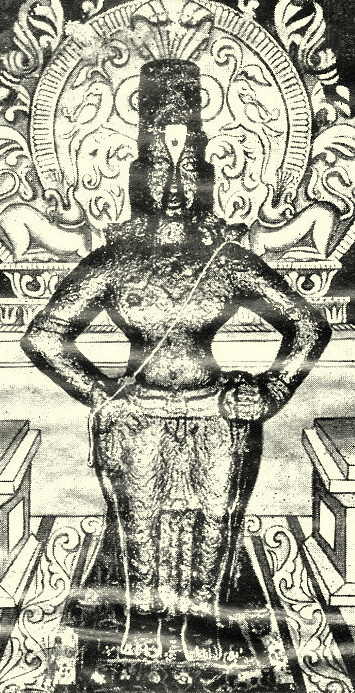
Vithoba, the patron god of Sena Nhavi

Sena the barber (nhavi), a "caste" (see Bara Balutedar) and worked in the service of the king of Bandhavgarh. He gave up his profession and created devotional abhangas in praise of the god Vithoba.

The Bhaktavijaya of Mahipati (1715–90), a hagiographical work on Hindu saints, devotes a chapter to the life of Sena Nhavi. It narrates how Vithoba came to the aid of Sena Nhavi. Sena Nhavi was a pious barber who worshipped Vishnu (Vithoba is considered a form of Vishnu or his avatar Krishna) daily in the morning. He was born into a low caste due to sins in a previous birth (see Reincarnation). Once, the king of Bandhavgarh called Sena to his service. The court official came with the message to Sena's house; however Sena was busy at his daily worship and instructed his wife to inform the messenger that he was not at home. This was repeated five times. A neighbour reported to the king that Sena was at home worshiping, which infuriated the king. He ordered Sena to be arrested for not coming to the palace despite royal orders and that he be bound in chains and be thrown into the river. Vithoba-Krishna went to the palace in the form of Sena to serve the king. While "Sena" massaged the king's head with oil, the king saw the reflection of the four-armed Krishna in a cup of oil, but when he looked up he saw "Sena". The perplexed king fainted. When he woke up, he requested "Sena" to wait on peril of death. However, "Sena" asked permission to go to his home once. The king rewarded "Sena" with a bag of gold coins, which "Sena" placed in his bag of equipment. Vithoba left the bag back at Sena's house and disappeared. The king lost all his senses and pined for Sena. The court official hurriedly came to fetch Sena, who felt that king had called him as he was angry with Sena.

Sena arrived at the court, when the king stood up and greeted up. The king rushed towards Sena, caught Sena's feet (see Pranāma, a sign of respect in Indian culture) and requested him to show his four-armed form. The king brought the bowl of oil and looked at the reflection of Sena in the oil, but could see the four-armed divine form that he had experienced. The surprised Sena explained to the king that he had seen Sena's patron god, Krishna himself. The king thanked Sena as he had seen Krishna due to association with Sena. When Sena found the gold coins in his bag of equipment, he distributed the coins to the Brahmins, the priest caste. The tale ends by stating that the Muslim king turned into a devotee of Krishna and Sena Nhavi was "pleased" as his Lord, Vishnu was pleased.

Two of Sena's abhangas say that he died at midday on the 12th lunar day of the dark fortnight of the Hindu month of Shravana.

== Teachings in abhangas ==
There are many abhangs written by Sena Nhavi. He says in an abhanga that those who keep the company of evil-doers live in hell. The wicked should be kicked and disgraced. In another abhanga, he calls himself a sinner, who was tamed by passion and anger, who did not keep company with the righteous and did not meditate on God. He surrenders to God and implores him to be his saviour and rescue him from the sinful life. In another abhanga, he sings how fortunate he is to have received the grace of the Lord, who with compassion pardoned his sins. Sena detested practising austerities like inhaling smoke or meditating amidst fire, in a forest or on a mountain. He warned that someone can be a victim of deception in the forest, citing how the sage Vibhandaka was deluded by a maiden in the forest. (Vibhandaka's penance was disturbed by the celestial maiden Urvashi). Like other Varkari saints, he advocates the chanting of God's name. Sena says that God's grace is beyond discrimination of caste or quality. Sena also refers to his profession as a barber in an abhanga. He sang that we ("barbers") are skilled in the "art of shaving" and support the four caste-system (Varna (Hinduism)). They show the "mirror of discrimination", use the "pinches of dispassion", massage the head with the "water of tranquillity", cut the "hair of egotism" and the "nails of passion". An abanga in the Shrisakalsantagatha, a collection of abhangas from various saints, is dedicated to the god Shiva of the Trimbakeshwar Shiva Temple.

== Remembrance ==
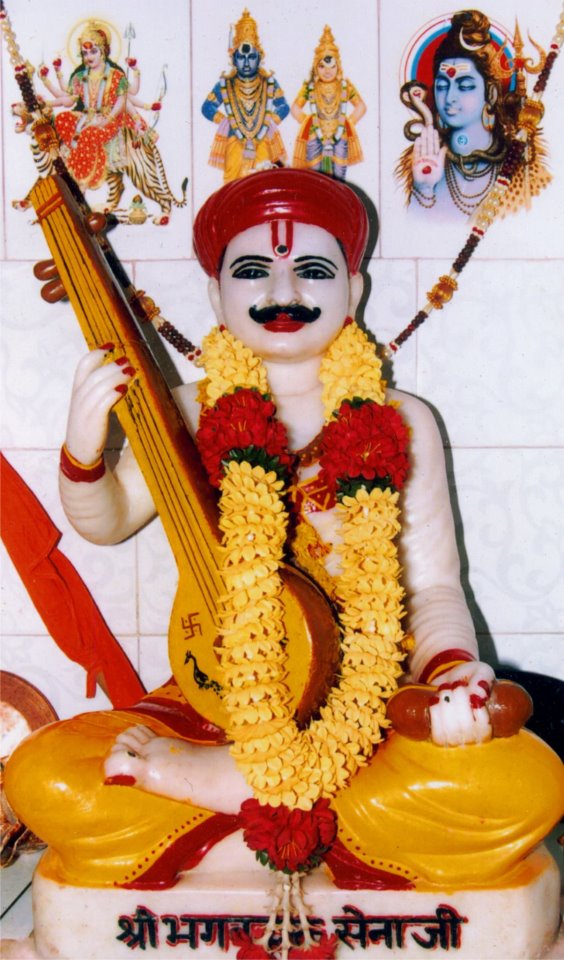
Sant Sena Hari Mandir, Chatpalli Building JC Nagar Hubli.

A hagiography to Sena appears in the abhangas of the 14th century Varkari saint-poet Janabai. In one of his abhangas, the Varkari saint-poet Tukaram (1577–c.1650) uses the example of Sena Nhavi and other saints who were low in the caste hierarchy to illustrate that caste is irrelevant when compared to devotion and merit. Sena was also described as a "model of devotion" by the 15th century north-Indian saint Ravidas, which suggests that he was widely known even outside Maharashtra. A temple dedicated to the saint also exists in Hubli.

== Notes ==
=== Sources ===
- Abbott, Justin Edwards; Godbole, Narhar R. (1988). Stories of Indian Saints: An English Translation of Mahipati's Marathi Bhaktavijaya. Vol. 2. Motilal Banarsidass. ISBN 81-208-0469-4.
- Kosambi, Meera (2000). Intersections: Socio-cultural Trends in Maharashtra. Orient Blackswan. ISBN 978-81-250-1878-0.
- Lochtefeld, James G. (2002). "Sen". The Illustrated Encyclopedia of Hinduism: N-Z. The Rosen Publishing Group. ISBN 978-0-8239-3180-4.
- Lorenzen, David N. (2006). Who Invented Hinduism: Essays on Religion in History. Yoda Press. ISBN 978-81-902272-6-1.
- Ranade, Ramchandra Dattatraya (1983). Mysticism in India: The Poet-Saints of Maharashtra. SUNY Press. ISBN 978-0-87395-669-7.
- Sharma, Arvind (2000). Women Saints in World Religions. SUNY Press. ISBN 978-0-7914-4619-5.
