= Bir Kuar =

Regional Hindu God

Bir Kuar or Birkuar (IAST: Bir-kuār), also known as Birnath, is a Hindu god worshipped by Yadavs of western Bihar in India. He is considered to be a form of god Krishna and was born in Krishnaut clan of Ahir. He is worshipped in form of wooden posts that depict him standing arms-akimbo. Bir Kuar is honoured as the protector of cattle.

== Legend ==
Bir Kuar's legend deals with the opposition between the cattle and the tiger and also impalement themes. Bir Kuar is also called to as "Lord of the Forest".

Ballads narrate the story of Bir Kuar or Birnath, who rescued the princess Madhumati from Mughal Empire soldiers. Madhumati was on her way to a pilgrimage to the Hindu holy city of Benaras, when she saw Mughal soldiers and cried. She requested a female-kite to inform her father that she was in danger, through a letter she wrote. When kite delivered the letter to the king - father of Madhumati, the king sent Madhumati's husband Birnath with his soldiers. Birnath rode a tiger and saved the princess. Ballads also narrate that Bir Kuar was born in the Hindu holy city of Ayodhya and reared in Palamau.

== Worship ==
Bir Kuar is often worshipped in form of wooden posts, made by carpenters from the mixed Ahir-Brahmin class. This wooden post is erected in open field to "fertilize she-buffaloes". In these posts, he is depicted in standing arms-akimbo. Bir Kuar is offered goat sacrifices. He is also offered clay horses, on the fulfilment of a vow. Bir Kuar is also worshipped in times of distress.

He is worshipped in 16-day festival called Sohorai (in October), which corresponds to festival of Diwali, celebrated in honour of the Hindu goddess of prosperity - Lakshmi. Ballads describing his exploits are sung during the festival. Bir Kuar is worshipped by offering of milk and erecting his icons in open fields.

== Associations ==
Bir Kuar is often associated with Krishna. Bir Kuar is depicted as flute-playing cowherd like Krishna. He acts like a ferryman like Krishna, helping milkmaids cross the river and having dalliance with them.

Bir Kuar is sometimes associated with the god Vithoba of Maharashtra - who is believed to be a form of Krishna too and depicted in an arms-akimbo posture like Bir Kuar. Images similar to Bir Kuar are found in states of Maharashtra.
