= Pandurangadu =

2008 Indian film by K. Raghavendra Rao

- Movie Poster
- Directed by: K. Raghavendra Rao
- Written by: J. K. Bharavi (story / dialogues)
- Screenplay by: K. Raghavendra Rao
- Based on: Life of Pundarika
- Produced by: K. Krishna Mohana Rao
- Starring: Nandamuri Balakrishna; Tabu; Sneha
- Cinematography: V. Jayaram
- Edited by: A. Sreekar Prasad
- Music by: M. M. Keeravani
- Production company: R. K. Film Associates
- Release date: 30 May 2008
- Running time: 156 minutes
- Country: India
- Language: Telugu

Pandurangadu is a 2008 Telugu-language biographical film, based on the life of Pundarika, produced by K. Krishna Mohana Rao on R. K. Film Associates banner, directed by K. Raghavendra Rao. Starring Nandamuri Balakrishna, Tabu and Sneha and music composed by M. M. Keeravani. The film is a remake of N. T. Rama Rao-starrer Panduranga Mahatyam (1957). The film received positive reviews, but became a box office bomb.

== Plot ==
Pundarika Ranganathudu is a follower of Krishna but for the wrong reasons and does not listen to his father and his mother. He does all the mischievous things that Krishna did in his reign. Once when his family members ask him to marry he leaves his village and runs away. After his family members perform a yagnam he comes back to his village. In the neighboring village, Lakshmi is an ardent devotee of Krishna. One night Krishna appears in her dreams and asks her to marry Pundarika. So Lakshmi's father approaches Pundarika but he refuses. Later, after some persuasion from Lakshmi, Pundarika accepts the marriage. Meanwhile, a dancer Amrutha comes to their village. Pundarika is mesmerized by her beauty and gets into a relationship with her. He offers all the gold in his house to her. But, after the marriage, he stops visiting Amrutha. Knowing this Amrutha's mother calls Pundarika for a meal and serves Kala Kuta Rasayana, which makes him violent at a small sound and grabs all his wealth. Then he lands in an unknown place where he kicks a saint and is cursed. The rest of the film is about how Pundarika returns to his family and becomes a devotee of Krishna.

== Cast ==
- Nandamuri Balakrishna in a dual role as Krishna and Pundarika Ranganadhudu
- Sneha as Lakshmi
- Tabu as Amrutha
- Mohan Babu as Saint (cameo appearance)
- K. Vishwanath as Jahnu Sarma
- L. B. Sriram as Narada
- Brahmanandam as Subbigadu
- Sunil as Julapalaaa Raju
- Ali
- Dharmavarapu Subramanyam
- M. Balayya
- Kanta Rao as Saint's father
- Gundu Hanumantha Rao as Bhojana Sastry
- Prasad Babu as Siva Sarma
- Sameer as Pundarika Ranganadu's brother-in-law
- Subbaraya Sharma as Dhanyanand Swamy
- Ananth
- Chitti Babu
- Jenny as Priest
- Meghna Naidu as item number
- Archana as Rukmini
- Suhasini as Satyabhama
- Siva Parvati as Lakshmi
- Sana as Pundarika Ranganadu's sister
- Sirisha
- Bhargavi
- Neethu
- Sumana Sri
- Radhika
- Aruna
- Apoorva as Chulamamba
- Saraswatamma as Saint's mother
- Y. Vijaya as Achalamamba
- Baby Kavya Kalyanram as Pundarika Ranganadu's niece

== Soundtrack ==
Pandurangadu

Film score by M. M. Keeravani
- Released: 2008
- Genre: Soundtrack
- Length: 47:33
- Label: Aditya Music
- Producer: M. M. Keeravani

M. M. Keeravani chronology
Krishnarjuna (2008)	Pandurangadu (2008)	Gunde Jhallumandi (2008)

Music composed by M. M. Keeravani.

No.	Title	Lyrics	Singer(s)	Length
1.	"Aadauv Devakidevi"		Pranavi	1:00
2.	"Govindude Koka Chutti"	Sri Vedavyas	Madhu Balakrishnan, Sunitha, M. M. Keeravani	5:36
3.	"Hey Krishna Mukunda"	Suddala Ashok Teja	S. P. Balasubrahmanyam, Hima Bindhu	5:00
4.	"Sahasra Sheersha"	Sri Vedavyas	Shankar Mahadevan	1:05
5.	"Yemani Adaganu"	Sri Vedavyas	S. P. Balasubrahmanyam, Malavika, Sowmya	3:37
6.	"Sri Sri Sri Rajadhi Raja"	Sri Vedavyas	Shankar Mahadevan, Geetha Madhuri	3:50
7.	"Govinda Krishna Jai"	Veturi	S. P. Balasubrahmanyam	3:50
8.	"Matrudevobhava"	Suddala Ashok Teja	S. P. Balasubrahmanyam, Malavika, MM Keeravani	6:06
9.	"Brundavamuna"	Sri Vedavyas	MM Keeravani, Usha	2:26
10.	"Jwalath Karaala"	K. Shiva Dutta	Chorus	0:41
11.	"Premavalambanam"	Sri Vedavyas	K. S. Chithra, Vijay Yesudas	4:08
12.	"Kosaladeshapu"	Chandrabose	S. P. Balasubrahmanyam, Sunitha	4:42
13.	"Mathapithrusamo"	K. Shiva Datta	Madhu Balakrishnan	0:33
14.	"Neela Megha"	Sri Vedavyas	S. P. Balasubrahmanyam	2:36
15.	"Jaya Ranga Ranga Vittala"	J. K. Bharavi	M. M. Keeravani	2:03
Total length:				47:33

== Reception ==
A critic from Rediff.com wrote that "Pandurangadu offers a refreshing alternative to the current crop of movies". Jeevi of Idlebrain.com rated the film three out of five and wrote that "The plus points are Bala Krishna and the music. On the flipside, the emotions would have been strongly established". A critic from Full Hyderabad wrote that "Pandurangadu is singularly devoid of any intelligence, subtlety or depth, and unless you want to see God on the silver screen, you should stay away".
