= Pundalik =

Character in Hindu mythology

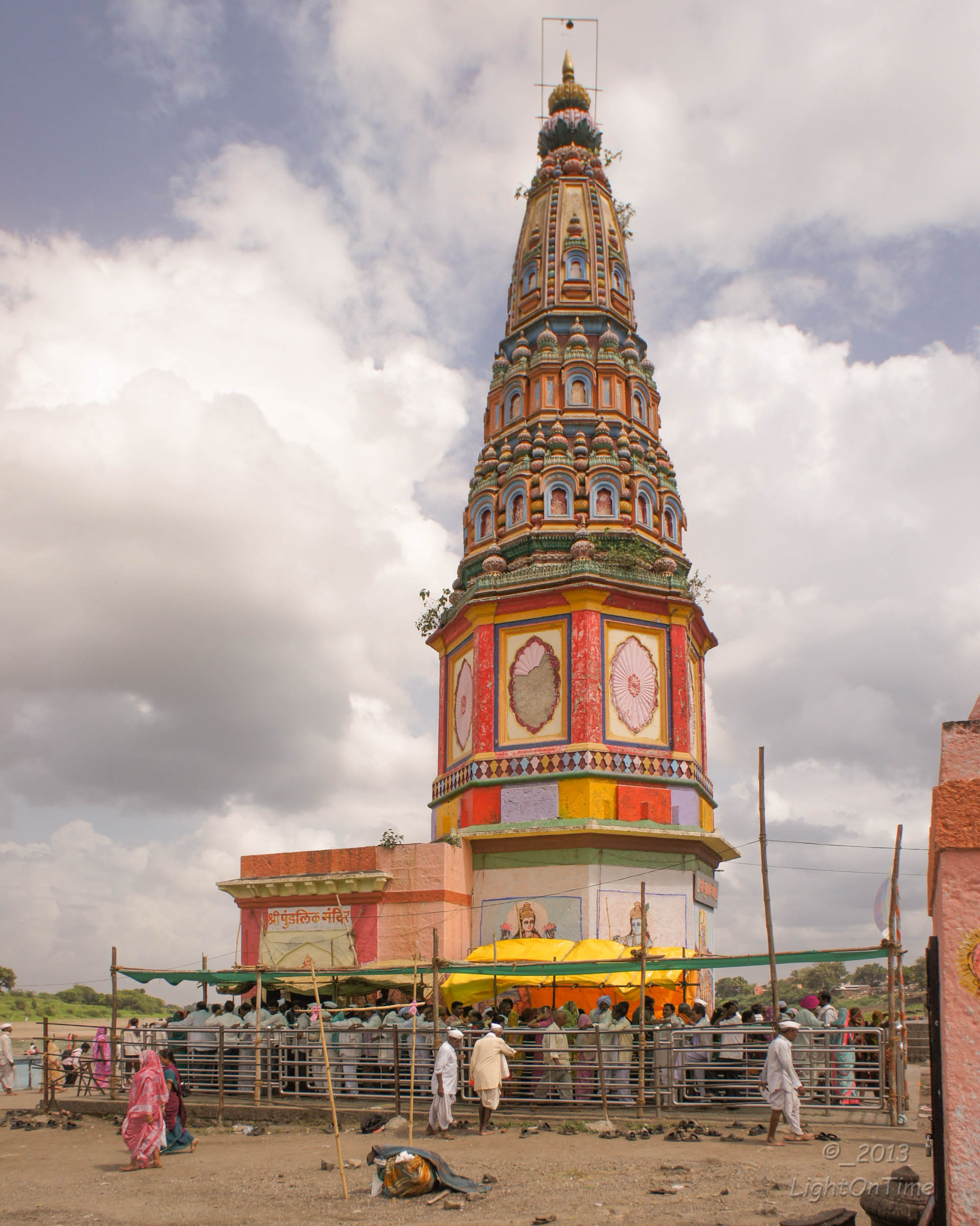
- Pundalik's temple at Pandharpur
- Affiliation: Varkari

Pundalik (Marathi: पुंडलिक) or Pundarika (Kannada: ಪುಂಡರೀಕ), (Sanskrit: पुण्डरीक, romanized: Puṇḍarīka) was an Indian saint and a devotee of the Hindu deity Vithoba. Vithoba is a Vaishnava deity, considered a reincarnation of Vishnu. Pundalik is believed to have brought Vithoba to Pandharpur, where the deity's main shrine stands today. He is also regarded as the historical founder of the Varkari sect, which is centered on the worship of Vithoba.

Pundalik was one of the earliest practitioners of Kundalini Yoga. As he was considered a master of Kundalini Yoga, people used to call him "Kundalik." Over time, the name evolved into "Pundalik," symbolising Kundalini energy in the form of Vitthala (also known as Panduranga). Vitthala of Pandharpur is regarded as an incarnation of Vishnu. According to legends, Vitthala also represents the symbol of Kundalini energy. However, in Hinduism, this energy is believed to spiritually reside within all beings.

The brick on which Vitthala stands represents the Muladhara Chakra, the foundation of Kundalini energy. His hands, positioned like bows, symbolise the Ida and Pingala nadis, which intersect at the central channel of the body, known as the Sushumna or Brahma nadi. His body represents Purusha, signifying Vishnu or Krishna, while the tilaka (the mark on his forehead) represents the Ajna Chakra (also known as the Guru Chakra or Third-Eye Chakra). This subtle energy centre, believed to be located between the eyebrows along the spinal column, is mentioned by Krishna in the Bhagavad Gita.

== History ==
Pundalik is a historical figure associated with the establishment and propagation of the Vithoba-centric Varkari sect. Ramakrishna Gopal Bhandarkar considers him the founder of the sect and the one who spread it in the Maratha region.

Frazer, Edwards, and P. R. Bhandarkar (1922) suggest that Pundalik attempted to unify the worship of Shiva and Vishnu, with this tradition originating in Karnataka. Ranade (1933) believes that Pundalik, a Kannada saint, was not only the founder of the Varkari tradition but also the first great devotee or high priest of the Pandharpur temple. Upadhyaya supports the priest theory but rejects the idea of Pundalik’s Kannada origin.

Tulpule also accepts that Pundalik was the historical founder of the Varkari sect but refrains from assigning a specific date to him due to a "lack of authentic evidence." According to M. S. Mate, Pundalik played a key role in persuading the Hoysala king Vishnuvardhana to build the Pandharpur temple dedicated to Vishnu, placing him in the early 12th century.

Deleury (1960) believes that Pundalik was a mystic influenced by the Vaishnava Haridasa sect of Karnataka and that he brought a significant transformation in the worship of Vithoba. He not only founded the Varkari sect but was also the first to identify Vithoba with Vishnu. Pundalik's fame led to the renaming of Pandharpur as Paundrika-Kshetra—the sacred place of Pundalik.

Other scholars, such as Raeside (1965), Dhanpalvar (1972), and Vaudeville (1974), have questioned the historicity of Pundalik altogether, dismissing him as a mythical figure.

In his analysis of the text Panduranga Mahatmya by Sridhar (discussed in the "Legend" section ahead), Raeside suggests that the legend of the devotee Pundalik could have been nothing more than a derivative of a Puranic legend. Dhanpalvar strongly agreed with this possibility. Vaudeville observed that the legend of Pundalik of Pandharpur closely resembles the story of Pundarika, the devotee of Vishnu, from the Mahabharata.

Religious historian R.C. Dhere, a Sahitya Akademi Award winner for his book Sri Vitthal: Ek Mahasamanvaya, opines that the identification of Vithoba with Vishnu led to the transformation of the Shaiva (Shiva-related) Pundarika shrine into the Vaishnava shrine of the devotee Pundalik. The main argument supporting this hypothesis is that Pundalik’s memorial shrine is a Shaiva shrine, rather than a Vaishnava one, as it contains a Shiva Linga, the symbolic representation of Shiva.

== Legends ==
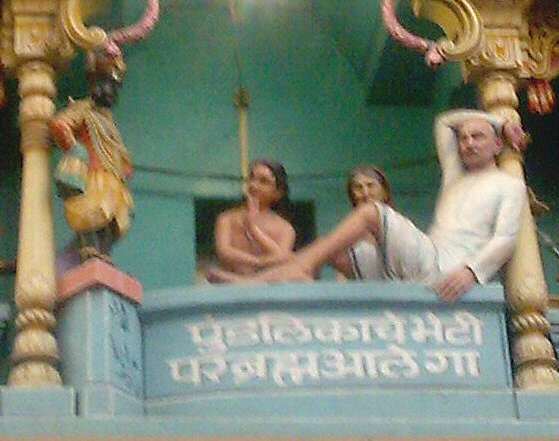
Image of a gopuram of a Pandharpur temple near Vithoba's central temple, depicting Vithoba (standing dark figure, left) waiting on the brick as Pundalik (centre) serves his parents.

Texts that narrate the legend of Pundalik and Vithoba can be categorised into three traditions: the Varkari tradition, the Brahmin tradition, and what Raeside refers to as a "third tradition," which incorporates elements of both Varkari and Brahmin traditions. The Varkari texts are written in Marathi, the Brahmin texts in Sanskrit, and the texts of the "third tradition" are Marathi compositions authored by Brahmins.

The Varkari texts include Bhaktalilamrita and Bhaktavijaya by Mahipati, Pundalika-Mahatmya by Bahinabai, and a long abhanga by Namdev. All these texts narrate the legend of Pundalik.

The Brahmin texts comprise:

- Two versions of Panduranga-Mahatmya from the Skanda Purana (consisting of 900 verses),
- Panduranga-Mahatmya from the Padma Purana (consisting of 1,200 verses),
- Bhima-Mahatmya, also from the Padma Purana, and
- Another Panduranga-Mahatmya, found in the Vishnu Purana.

The "third tradition" is represented in two works:

- Panduranga-Mahatmya by the Brahmin Sridhara (consisting of 750 verses), and
- Another work of the same name by Prahlada Maharaj (consisting of 181 verses).

There are three versions of the Pundalik legend, two of which appear as textual variants in the Skanda Purana (1.34–67).

According to the first version, the ascetic Pundarika (Pundalik) is described as a devotee of Vishnu, dedicated to serving his parents. The god Gopala-Krishna, a form of Vishnu, arrives from Govardhana as a cowherd, accompanied by his grazing cows, to meet Pundarika. Krishna is depicted in a digambara (unclothed) form, adorned with makara-kundala (crocodile-shaped earrings), the srivatsa mark, a headdress of peacock feathers, and with his hands resting on his hips while holding a cowherd’s staff between his thighs.

Pundarika requests Krishna to remain in this form on the banks of the Chandrabhaga River, believing that his presence will make the site both a tirtha (a sacred place near a water body) and a kshetra (a sacred place near a temple). This location is identified as modern-day Pandharpur, situated on the banks of the Chandrabhaga. The description of Krishna in this legend closely resembles the features of the Pandharpur image of Vithoba.

The second version of the legend describes Vithoba appearing before Pundalik as Bala Krishna the five-year-old child form of Krishna. This version is found in manuscripts of both Puranas, the work of Prahlada Maharaj, and the writings of poet-saints, notably Tukaram.

The third version of the Pundalik legend appears in Sridhara’s work and as a variant in the Padma Purana. In this account, Pundalik, a Brahmin deeply in love with his wife, neglects his aged parents. However, after meeting the sage Kukkuta, he undergoes a transformation and dedicates his life to serving them.

One day, Krishna arrives at Dandivana forest, near Pundalik’s house, searching for his angry wife, Rukmini, who has left him. After some coaxing, Krishna pacifies Rukmini and then visits Pundalik, finding him engaged in serving his parents. To avoid interrupting his service, Pundalik throws a brick outside for Krishna to stand on. Krishna waits patiently on the brick until Pundalik completes his duties.

Impressed by Pundalik’s devotion, Krishna grants him a boon. Pundalik requests that his deity, in the form of Vithoba—standing arms akimbo on the brick—remain there with Rukmini, as Rakhumai, to bless devotees forever.

== In popular culture ==
Panduranga Mahatyam, 1957 Telugu film based on his life story, as is the Marathi film, Bhakta Pundalik (1975), also Shree Pundalik (1912), a silent film.
