= Shakala Shakha =

Branch of Rigveda

Shakala Shaka (Sanskrit: शाकल शाखा; IAST: Śākala Śākhā), is the oldest shakha (from skt. śākhā f. "branch" or "recension") of the Rigveda. The Śākala tradition is mainly followed in Maharashtra, Karnataka, Kerala, Odisha, Tamil Nadu and Uttar Pradesh. The Mahābhāṣya of Patañjali refers to 21 śākhās of the Rigveda; however, according to Śaunaka's Caraṇa-vyuha there are five śākhās for the Rigveda: the Śākala, Bāṣkala, Aśvalayana, Śaṅkhāyana, and Māṇḍukāyana, of which only the Śākala and Bāṣkala and few of the Aśvalayana are now extant. The only complete recension of Rigveda known today is of the Śākala School. There is a claim that Śaṅkhāyana Śākhā is still known to a few Vedapathis in Uttar Pradesh and Gujarat but this is not certain.

The main saṃhitā for Śākala Sākhā is the Śākala Saṃhitā and the corresponding brahmana is Aitareya Brāhmaṇa. The main Upaniṣat of the Śākala Śākhā is Aitareya Upaniṣat. The Śrauta Sūtram for Śākala Shākhā is Āśvalāyaṇa Śrauta Sūtra and the Gṛhya Sutra is Āśvalāyana Gṛhya Sūtram. The Āraṇyaka of Śākala Śākhā is Aitareya Āraṇyaka.

== Shiksha ==
Śikṣā as a term for phonetics, is first used in Taittirīya Upaniṣad, which gives its various components which include Varna (individual sounds) and Svara (accent). The Pratishakhyas are among the earlier texts of Shiksha. Pratiśākhya literally means " belonging to each śākhā". In the Rigveda the Pratishakhya available today is ascribed to Shaunaka. This is also known as Śākala Pratiśākhya and belongs to Śaiśirīya Śākhā, a branch of "Śākala Śākhā".

== Prominent people ==
The major āchāryas who belonged to the Śākala Śākhā included:

- Padmanabha Tirtha (samadhi 1324 CE), a Hindu Dvaita philosopher, dialectician, the direct disciple of Madhvacharya and the acharya who is known for spreading Tattvavada outside the Tulunadu region.
- Jayatirtha (1345–1388) - a Hindu Dvaita philosopher, dialectician, polemicist and the 6th peetha of Madhvacharya Peetha.
- Eknath (1533–1599) - a Hindu Vaishnava saint, scholar, and religious poet of the Varkari Sampradaya
- Samarth Ramdas (1608–1681) - a Hindu Vaishnava saint and devotee of Lord Rama.
- Mahipati (1715–1790), an 18th century Hindu Vaishnava Varkari saint.
- Manik Prabhu (1817–1865) - a Hindu Advaita saint, philosopher, poet and guru of Dattatreya tradition.
- Satyadhyana Tirtha (1872–1942) - a Hindu Dvaita philosopher-saint, scholar, yogi, mystic, theologian and the 38th peetadhipathi of Uttaradi Math.

== Bibliography ==
- Dalal, Roshen (2014). The Vedas: An Introduction to Hinduism's Sacred Texts. Penguin UK. ISBN 9788184757637.
- Hebbar, B.N (2005). The Sri-Krsna Temple at Udupi: The History and Spiritual Center of the Madhvite Sect of Hinduism. Bharatiya Granth Nikethan. ISBN 81-89211-04-8.
- Sharma, B. N. Krishnamurti (2000). A History of the Dvaita School of Vedānta and Its Literature, Vol 1. 3rd Edition. Motilal Banarsidass (2008 Reprint). ISBN 978-8120815759.
