= Bhaktalilamrita =

Bhaktalilamrita is a text by Mahipati about the Varkari saint-poets.
