= Panduranga Mahatyam =

- Theatrical release poster
- Directed by: Kamalakara Kameswara Rao
- Written by: Samudrala Jr
- Based on: life of Pundarika
- Produced by: N. Trivikrama Rao
- Starring: N. T. Rama Rao; Anjali Devi; B. Saroja Devi
- Cinematography: M. A. Rehman
- Edited by: G. D. Joshi
- Music by: T. V. Raju
- Production company: National Art Theater
- Release date: 28 November 1957
- Running time: 175 minutes
- Country: India
- Language: Telugu

Panduranga Mahatyam (transl. The glory of Panduranga) is a 1957 Indian Telugu-language biographical film, based on the life of Pundarika, produced by N. Trivikrama Rao under the National Art Theatres banner and directed by Kamalakara Kameswara Rao. It stars N. T. Rama Rao, Anjali Devi and B. Saroja Devi (in her Telugu debut) with music composed by T. V. Raju. The film was dubbed into Tamil as Annaiyum Pithavum Munnari Dheivam (1959) and it was again remade as the Telugu film Pandurangadu (2008).

== Cast ==
- N. T. Rama Rao as Pundarika
- Anjali Devi as Rama
- B. Saroja Devi as Kalavati
- V. Nagayya as Jahnavi
- Padmanabham as Hari
- Govindarajula Subba Rao as Rama's father
- Vangara as Panthulu
- K. V. S. Sarma as Vritrasura and Sage Kukkuta (dual role)
- Kasturi Siva Rao as Rangadasu
- Balakrishna as Ramadasu
- Peketi Sivaram as Kalavati's paramour
- Rushyendramani as Lakshmi
- Chhaya Devi as Suramma
- Ammaji as Champa
- Sowcar Janaki as Rama's sister
- Vijaya Nirmala as Lord Krishna

== Soundtrack ==
Music was composed by T. V. Raju. Lyrics were written by Samudrala Jr. The songs Jaya Krishna Mukunda Murari, Amma Ani Pilichina are evergreen blockbusters. Lyrics for the Tamil dubbed version were penned by Kuyilan.

S. No.	Song title	Singers	Duration
1	"Aanandhamidhenoi"	P. Susheela	2:49
2	"Amma Ani"	Ghantasala	7:37
3	"Chebithe Vintivaa Guru Guru"	Pithapuram, Madhavapeddi Satyam	2:48
4	"Ekkadoyi Muddula Bava"	Pithapuram, A. P. Komala	4:06
5	"Hara Hara Sambho"	Ghantasala	2:07
6	"Jaya Jaya Gokula"	V. Nagayya	2:32
7	"Jaya Krishna Mukunda Murari"	Ghantasala	11:03
8	"Kanavera Muni Raja"	P. Leela	3:44
9	"Neevani Nenani"	Ghantasala, P. Susheela	3:14
10	"Oh Dari Kanani"	M. S. Rama Rao	2:51
11	"Pedhavula Ragam"	Jikki	3:01
12	"Sannuthi Seyave Manasaa"	V. Nagayya	3:28
13	"Tharam Tharam Nirantharam"	Ghantasala	3:21
14	'Tholu Thitthi Idhi"	Pithapuram, Madhavapeddi Satyam	3:12
15	"Vannela Chinnela"	Ghantasala, P. Leela	2:55
16	"Lakshmi Nrusimha Vibhave"	V. Nagayya	0:53
17	"Sri Kamini Kamitakara"	Ghantasala	2:03
18	"Aadi Beeja Ekhale"	Ghantasala	
19	"Tuma Bina More"	A. P. Komala	
20	"Aaj Ka Sunehra Din hai"	Ghantasala	
21	"Aatalada Ra Ra Kannyya"	A. P. Komala	
22	"Akkadavunde Pandurangadu"	Ghantasala, P. Susheela	1:50

== Release ==
It had a 100-day run in 9 centers and celebrated a silver jubilee in Vijayawada and Guntur centers.

== Awards ==
- Nandamuri Taraka Ramarao won the Filmfare Best Actor Award (Telugu) (fourth in succession) for his portrayal of Pundarika.
