= Bahinabai =

Indian Hindu Saint (1628–1700)

- Born: 1628; Devgaon rangari near Ellora, Maharashtra, India
- Died: 1700 (aged 71–72)
- Burial place: Shivoor, Vaijapur, Aurangabad
- Notable work: Autobiography Atmamanivedana or Bahinibai Gatha, devotional abhangas, Pundalika-Mahatmya
- Honors: Sant in Marathi, meaning "Saint"

Bahinabai (1628–1700 AD) or Bahina or Bahini was a female Varkari saint from Maharashtra, India. She is considered a disciple of the Varkari poet-saint Tukaram. Having been born in a Brahmin family, Bahinabai was married to a widower at a young age and spent most of her childhood wandering around Maharashtra along with her family. She describes, in her autobiography Atmamanivedana, her spiritual experiences with a calf and visions of the Varkari's patron deity Vithoba and Tukaram. She reports being subjected to verbal and physical abuse by her husband, who despised her spiritual inclination but who finally accepted her chosen path of devotion (bhakti). Unlike most female-saints who never married or renounced their married life for God, Bahinabai remained married her entire life.

Bahinabai's abhanga compositions, written in Marathi, focus on her troubled marital life and the regret being born a woman. Bahinabai was always torn between her duties to her husband and her devotion to Vithoba. Her poetry mirrors her compromise between her devotion to her husband and God.

== Early life ==
Bahinabai has written an autobiographical work called Atmamanivedana or Bahinibai Gatha, where she describes not only her current birth but also twelve previous births. The first 78 verses of the total 473 trace her current life.

As per the account, she was born in Deogaon (Rangari) or Devgaon (R) near Ellora or Verul in northern Maharashtra, where she spent her childhood. Her parents, Aaudev Kulkarni and Janaki were brahmins, the Hindu priest class, and considered their first child Bahinabai as a harbinger of good fortune. Bahinabai started reciting the names of God from an early age, while playing with her mates.

Bahinabai was married at the age of three with a thirty-year-old widower called Gangadhar Pathak, who she describes as a scholar and "an excellent jewel of a man", but stayed with parents until she reached puberty as per the custom. When Bahinabai was about nine years old, she with her parents and husband, had to leave Devghaon due to a family dispute. They wandered with pilgrims along the banks of river Godavari and begged for grain, as customarily wandering holy men do. They visited Pandharpur, the city which hosts the chief temple of Vithoba, in this period. By the age of eleven, she with her family finally settled in Kolhapur. She was "subjected to the demands of married life" at this age, but she was not into it.

== Later life ==
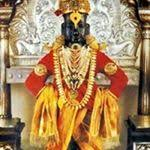
Bahinabai reported visions of the Varkari's patron deity Vithoba, pictured

In Kolhapur, Bahinabai was exposed to Hari-Kirtana songs and tales from the scripture Bhagavata Purana. Here, Bahinabai's husband was gifted a cow, who soon gave birth to a calf. Bahinabai reports a spiritual encounter with the calf. The calf, in Varkari literature, symbolises a person who has attained the highest state of yogic concentration in the previous birth, but due to some fault, is forced to take birth as a calf. The calf followed Bahinabai wherever she went. Bahiabai with the calf also attended the Kirtana of the famed swami Jayaram. Jayaram patted heads of the calf and Bahinabai. When Bahinabai's husband heard of the incident, he dragged Bahinabai by her hair, beat and tied her up in the house. Following this, the calf and the cow gave up food and water leading to the former's death. At its burial, Bahinabai fainted and lay unconscious for days. She awoke with her first vision of the Varkari's patron deity Vithoba and later of her contemporary poet-saint Tukaram. Following the incident, she had another vision of the duo that revived her from the sorrow of the calf's death. In these visions, Tukaram fed her nectar and taught her the mantra "Rama-Krishna-Hari". Thereafter, Bahinabai pronounced Tukaram as her guru. In her visions, Tukaram initiated her into the path of bhakti (devotion) and instructed her to recite the name of Vithoba. Some people considered her behaviour as a sign of madness, while others considered it a mark of sainthood.

Bahinabai's husband dissuaded her by saying that she being of a Brahmin, should not listen to the lower caste Shudra Tukaram. However, Bahinabai did not find happiness in the life of a dutiful wife and turns to bhakti, at the same time serving her husband. As her fame spread, her husband is portrayed to have been jealous of the attention Bahinabai received. Her hot-tempered husband is reported to have abused, beaten and confined Bahinabai to the cattle-shed. When all methods fail to deter her, he decided to leave Bahinabai, who was three months pregnant at the time. However, he could not do so as he suffered a burning limbs sensation lasting a month, on the day of departure. Finally, he repented and was convinced of Bahinabai's faith and devotion to God. At the same time, Bahinabai realised her neglect of her husband and decided "serving him was more important than devoting herself to (another) god." Bahinabai writes:

I'll serve my husband – he's my god ...
My husband's my guru; my husband's my way this
is my heart's true resolve.
If my husband goes off, renouncing the world,
Pandurang (Vithoba), what good will it do me to live among men? ...
My husband's the soul; I'm the body ...
My husband's the water; I'm a fish in it.
How can I survive? ...
Why should the stone god Vitthal (Vithoba)
and the dream saint Tuka (Tukaram)
deprive me of the happiness I know?

The family of Bahinabai went to Dehu, the home-town of Tukaram and paid their respects to him. Here, the brahmin Bahinabai's acceptance of the lower caste Shudra Tukaram as her guru, agitated local brahmins, which led to harassment of the family and threatening of ostracism. In Dehu, Bahinabai gave birth to a daughter, who she named Kasibai. But, she was distressed and mediated suicide. Tukaram in her vision, stopped her and blessed her with poetic powers and prophesied that she would have a son who was a companion in her previous birth, thus Bahinabai is believed to have started composition of poetry, the first of which were dedicated to Vithoba. Consequently, she had a son, who she named Vithoba, the exact time of his birth is not provided, but he is mentioned in a later part of her autobiography.

Finally the family moved to Shirur, where Bahinabai practised a vow of silence for a while. In 1649, on Tukaram's death, Bahinabai revisited Dehu and fasted for eighteen days where, according to the traditional account, she was blessed with a vision of Tukaram again. She then visited the saint Ramdas and stayed in his company until his death in 1681. Afterwards she returned to Shirur.

In last sections of her autobiography, Bahinabai says she has "seen her death". She prophesied her death and wrote a letter to Vithoba, her son, who had gone to Shukeshwar to perform last rites of his wife. On her death-bed, Bahinabai told Vithoba (her son) that he had been her son throughout her twelve previous births and also in her current (thirteenth) birth, which she believed was her last. Further, she narrated the tale of her twelve previous births, which are recorded in her autobiography. She died in 1700, at the age of 72.

== Literary works ==
Apart from her autobiography, Bahinabai composed abhangas, which deal with various subjects like praise of god Vithoba, Atman, Sad-guru, sainthood, and devotion. Bahinabai's abhanga compositions also focus on her troubled relationship with her husband, the conflict between husband and wife, and to certain extent its resolution. She even portrays her husband's hostile and harmful feelings with empathy. Unlike many of the woman-saints of the period, Bahinabai remained married her entire life, dutifully serving her husband, balancing her roles pativrata (a devoted wife) and virakta (the detached). Bahinabai does not revolt against social traditions and believed denouncement of the world is not the solution to a woman's suffering. Her poetry reflects her compromise between her devotion to her husband and her god Vithoba.

Bahinabai also comments on the duties of a married woman. Some abhangas extol the merits of a pativrata, others advocate pure devotion to God which may lead to the ire of society. Others advocate the compromise. She also speaks of pravrtti (action) and nivrtti (quiescence), personified as wives of manas (the mind). Both of them argue over their own superiority, winning a particular moment in the debate and finally reconciling and together directing the mind to its ultimate goal. In her own life, Bahinabai sought to balance these two: pravrtti – the duties of a virtuous wife and nivrtti – renunciation of the world.

Bahinabai sometimes curses her fate of being born as a woman, which author Tharu interprets as "her skepticism, her rebelliousness and her insistent refusal to abandon her aspiration for the truth". She regrets her female birth as she was kept away from the knowledge of the holy scriptures like Vedas and sacred mantras, by the (only male) Brahmin rules. Bahinabai sings in her abhanga:

The Vedas cry aloud, the Puranas shout
"No good may come to woman."
I was born with a woman's body
How am I to attain Truth?
"They are foolish, seductive and deceptive –
Any connection with a woman is disastrous."
Bahina says, "If a woman's body is so harmful,
How in this world will I reach Truth?"

At times, Bahinabai's abhangas call out to her god Vithoba (Panduranga, Hari) to help her to balance her twin roles. Bahinabai's wisdom can be summed up in her words as: "A woman's body is a body controlled by somebody else. Therefore the path of renunciation is not open to her." Bahinabai's philosophy reveals the social status of the seventeenth century Indian woman, who was supposed to no existence apart from her husband.

She has also composed a text called Pundalika-Mahatmya, which details the legend of Vithoba and devotee Pundalik, a central figure in Varkari tradition.
