= Bhaktavijaya =

Maha Bhakta vijaya is a Marathi text by Mahipati around 1762 that extols the deeds of the saint-poets of the Varkari sect of Hinduism. It has been translated into various languages in India and is widely read. It forms an important part of the prayer for devotees of Vithoba at Pandharpur. An English translation was published under the provisions of the will of Justin E. Abbott in 1933.

It gives a short biographic account of the various devotees from India:

- Namdev
- Tukaram
- Meerabai
- Jñāneśvar
- Tulsidas
- Eknath
- Surdas
- Kabir
- Matsyendranath, Gorakhnath
- Chokhamela
- Rohidas
- Narsinh Mehta

and many others.
