= Mahipati =

Indian hagiographer

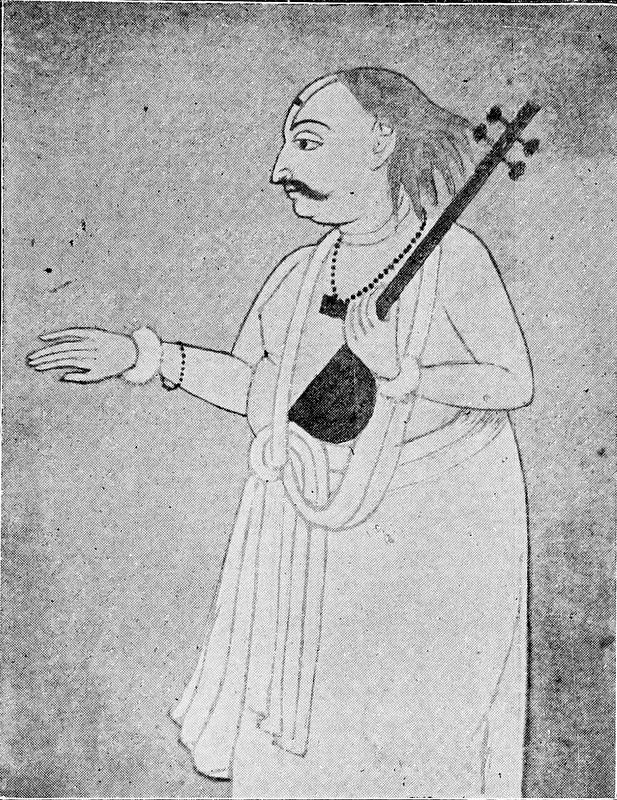
Mahipati

Mahipati (1715–1790) was an 18th-century Marathi language hagiographer who wrote biographies of prominent Hindu Vaishnava sants who had lived between the 13th and the 17th centuries in Maharashtra and other regions of India.

== Early life ==
Mahipati was born in a Marathi Deshastha Rigvedi Brahmin family of Shakala Shakha and Vasishta gotra to Dadopant Kamble who was the hereditary Kulkarni (record keeper) of Taharabad in present day Ahmednagar district of Maharashtra. Dadopant and his wife were devotees of Vithoba of Pandharpur. After his father's death, he inherited the job of Kulkarni for Taharabad. He also worked for a local Mughal landlord. After falling out with his landlord, Mahipati devoted the rest of his life to performing Kirtans on lives of saints, collecting information on these saints and writing their hagiographies.

== Works ==
During his life, Mahipati played down his abilities, his hagiographies of the Varkari saints are considered to be the most authoritative. Mahipati claimed Varkari sant Tukaram as the inspiration for his writings. Although in early part of his literary career he relied on works by Nabha Dass and Uddhava Ciddhan for his biographies, he soon realized shortcomings in their accounts of the saints and started collecting information himself. Mahipati, at times, during his life wrote multiple biographies of the same saint. He included any new information he obtained about the saint in his newer biographies. He also believed that the lives of the revered saints can not be grasped in a single sweep. Callewaert et al, therefore call the later biographies as the "revised editions of the old books. Mahipati wrote his biographies in the Ovi metre. Christian Lee Novetzke considers Mahipati's work to be a kind of transcribed kirtan. Indeed during his life mahipati, per Novetzke, was known as a kirtankar (Kirtan performer) rather than a writer.

Selected Works

Work	Chapters	Number of Ovis	Year of Composition
Bhaktavijaya	57	9916	1762
Kathasaramrita (1765)	12	7200	1765
Santalilaamrit (1757)	35	5259	1757
Bhaktalilaamrit (1774)	51	10794	1774
Santavijayaश्	26 (incomplete)	4628	1796
Pandharimahatmya	12	-	-
Anantvratkatha	-	186	-
dattatryeya janma	-	112	-
tulasi Mahatmya	5	763	-
Ganeshpuran	4 (Incomplete)	304	-
Pandurang stotra	-	308	-
Muktabharan vrat	-	101	-
Rishpanchami vrat	-	142	-
Apradh nivedan stotra	-	101	-
Sphut abhang and stotre	-	-	-

== Legacy ==
- An English translation of Bhaktavijaya, originally written by Mahipati around 1762, was published under the provisions of the will of American Missionary, Justin E. Abbott in 1933.
- Mahipati's town of Tahrabad has declared as a pilgrimage site by the government of Maharashtra. A pilgrim guest house has been constructed in the town for Mahipati devotees.
- The pilgrimage complex in tahrabad includes his house, a Vitthal temple and a memorial to Mahipati consisting of a Tulasi Vrindavan.
- Mahipati used to perform the annual Pandharpur Wari during his lifetime. The tradition continues with his symbolic sandals taken to Pandharpur from Tahrabad by his followers.

== Gallery ==
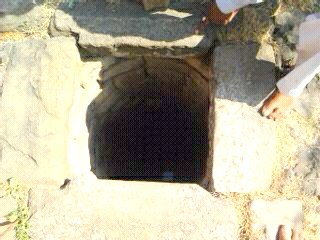
Mahipati Well in Taharabad

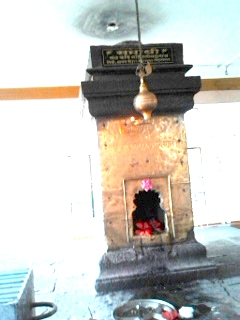
Mahipati Memorial in Taharabad

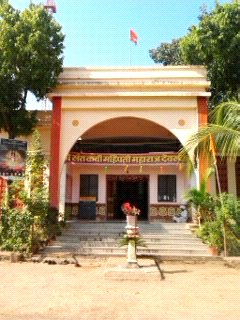
Mahipati Temple in Taharabad

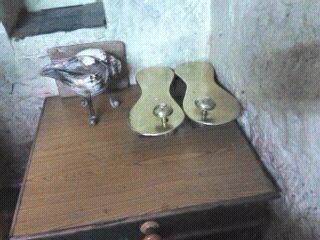
Mahipati Paduka ( Ceremonial Sandals) in Taharabad
