= Sulewadi =

Village in Maharashtra

Coordinates: 17°19′17″N 73°55′48″E

Sulewadi is a village situated in Malshiras tehsil and located in the Solapur district of Maharashtra, India. It is on the road to Pandharpur. The village has a population of only around 3000. The village people live quietly. Agriculture is the main occupation of the people of the village. Sorghum, maize and millet are farmed in the rainy season, the people of the village to a large extent plant these crops, as well as pepper, brinjal, tomato, and cavali.

Vithal Dayaji Temple is located in the village.
