= Pandharpur Vari =

Annual spiritual pilgrimage in Maharashtra, India

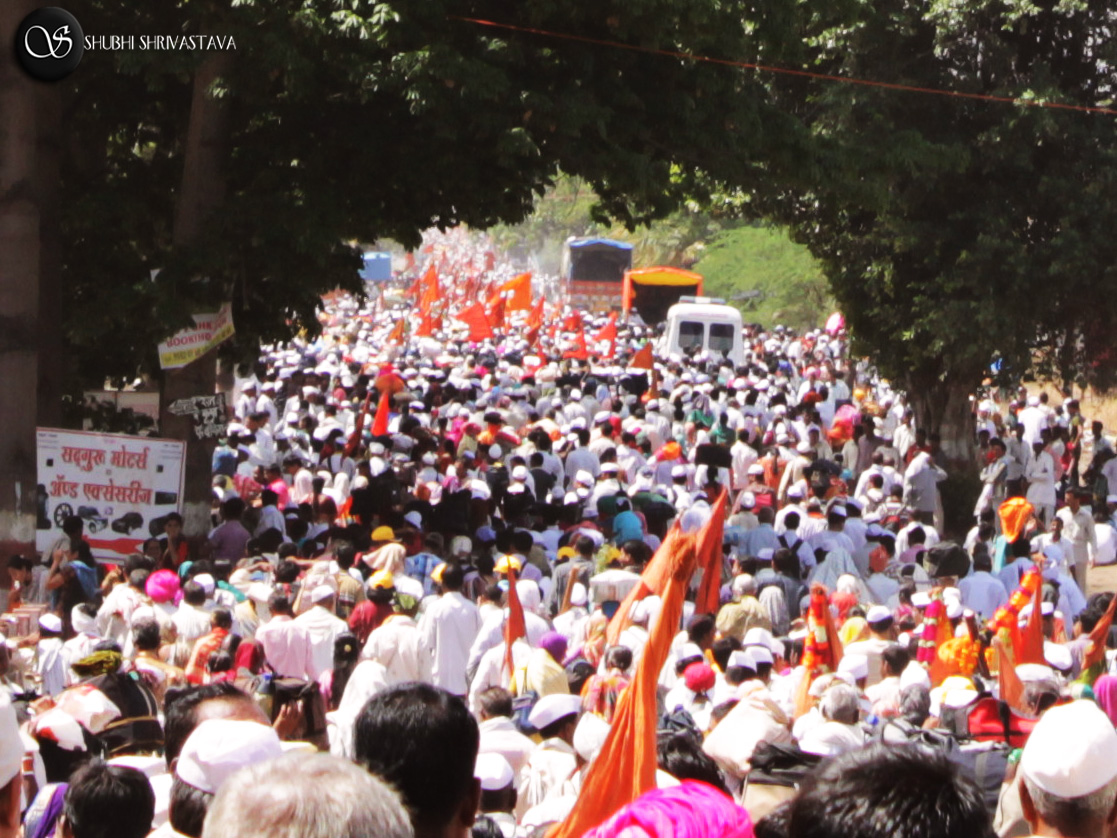
- A procession of Palkhi to Pandharpur
- Also called: Palkhi
- Observed by: Hindu
- Type: Spiritual
- 2025 date: 18 June - 6 July
- 2026 date: 7 July - 25 July
- Duration: 20 days
- Frequency: Annual

Pandharpur Vari, or Vari is an annual Yatra to Pandharpur, Maharashtra, to honor Vithoba. It involves carrying the paduka of a saint in a palkhi, most notably of Dnyaneshwar and Tukaram, from their respective shrines to Pandharpur. Many pilgrims join this procession on foot. Varkari is a Marathi term which means "one who performs the Vari". The tradition is more than 700 to 800 years old.

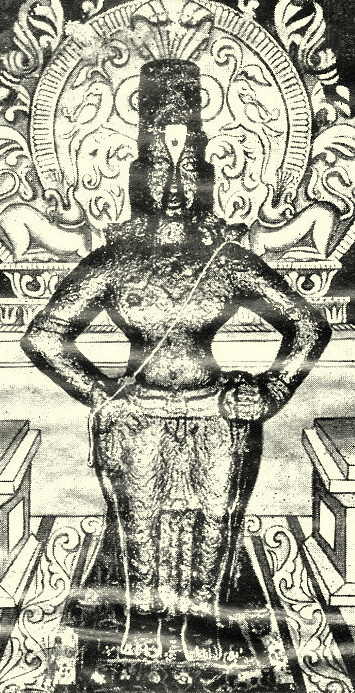
The Vari is undertaken in honour of the god Vithoba.

Marches happen on foot from various locations in Maharashtra to Vithoba Temple. This yatra takes 21 days. Along the way, many other palkis join the two most revered palkhis. Starting from their towns located in the Pune district of Maharashtra: Sant Dnyaneshwar's palkhi leaves from Alandi, while Tukaram's begins at Dehu. The Vari culminates at the Vithoba Temple on the holy occasion of Shayani Ekadashi (Ashadi Ekadashi). Devotees from across Maharashtra and nearby areas leave for Pandharpur, wearing holy basil beads and singing the glories of Vithoba and songs like "Dñyanbā Tukārām", commemorating the saints. When they reach Pandharpur on Shayani Ekadashi, the devotees bathe in the sacred Bhima River before visiting the temple.

== History ==
=== Beginnings ===
Various views exist on the origins of the wari (Marathi: पंढरपूरची वारी or वारी). According to one theory, Vitthalpant, the father of the Varkari saint Dnyaneshwar, began the wari to visit Pandharpur in the Hindu months of Ashadha and Kartika. The tradition of performing a Vari is generally regarded to have existed for more than 800 years.

Another theory credits Dnyaneshwar and Tukaram to have started the pilgrimage. They used to take a journey to Pandharpur by foot for 15 days, reaching Pandharpur's Vithoba Temple on Shayani Ekadashi. The tradition of carrying the paduka of the saints was started by the Tukaram's youngest son, Narayan Maharaj, in 1685.

=== British era ===
Changes were brought to the pilgrimage in the 1820s by Tukaram's descendants and a devotee of Dnyaneshwar named Haibatravbaba Arphalkar, who was a courtier of the Scindia. Haibatravbaba is credited with the organization of the wari in use today. This involved carrying the paduka in a palkhi, having horses involved in the procession, and organizing the devotees or varkaris in Dindis (Dindi stands for a specific group of varkaris).

== Palkhi route ==
Location of Pandharpur and the starting place of important palkhis in Maharashtra

Day	Sant Tukaram Maharaj Palkhi	Sant Dnyaneshwar Maharaj Palkhi
1	Dehu	
2	Akurdi	Alandi
3	Nana Peth	Bhavani Peth
4	Hadapsar	Pune
5	Loni Kalbhor	Saswad
6	Yavat	Saswad
7	Varvand	Jejuri
8	Baramati	Walhe
9	Indapur	Lonand
10	Akluj	Taradgaon
11	Malshiras	Phaltan
12	Natepute	Barad
13	Velapur	Natepute
14	Pirachi Kuroli	Malshiras
15	Bhandishegaon	Velapur
16	Wakhari	Bhandishegaon
17	Wakhari	
18	Pandharpur	
19	Vithoba Temple	

== Wari in present times ==
Pandharpur Vari in Hinduism
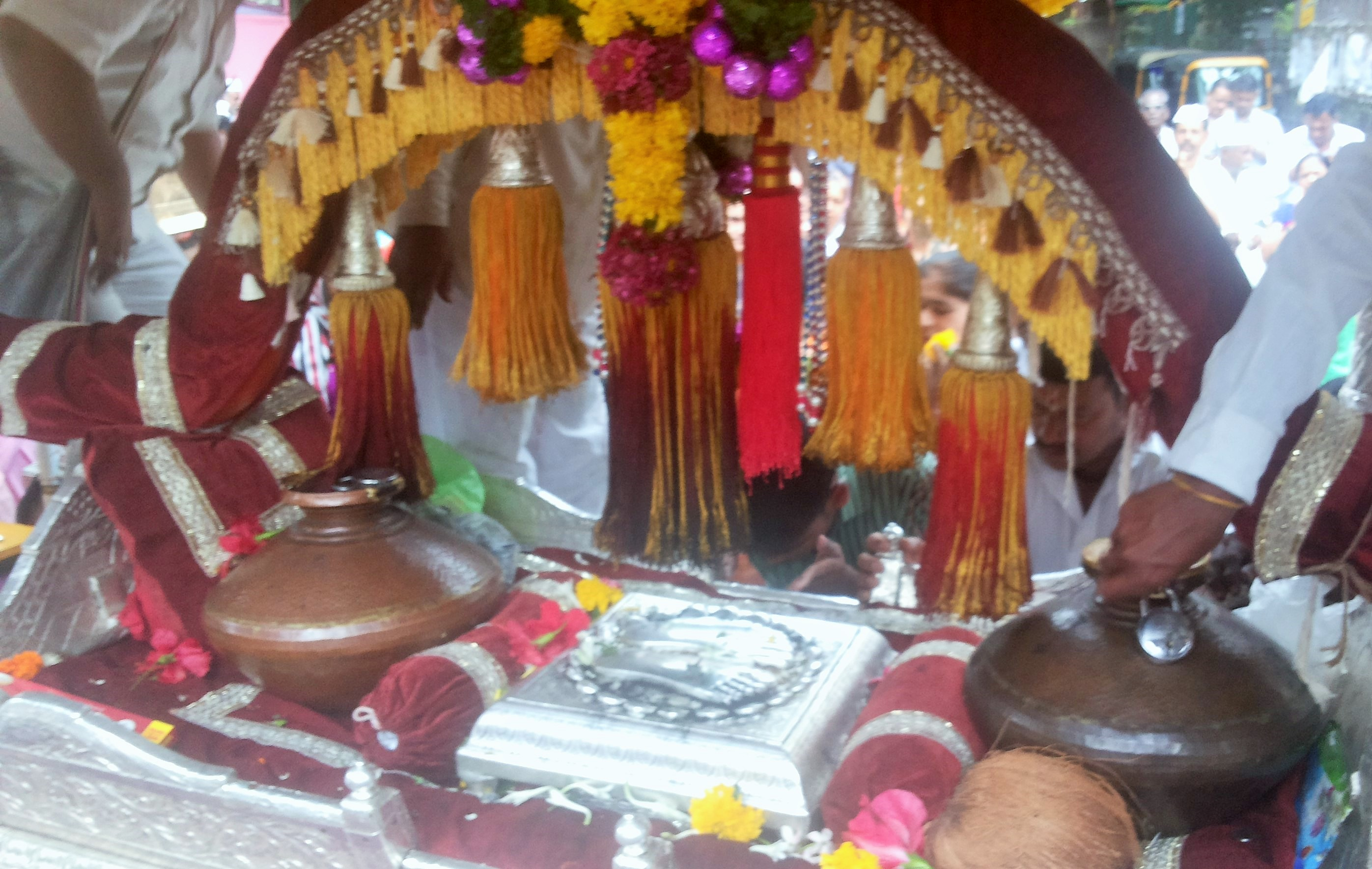
Tukaram Maharaj palakhi (palanquin)

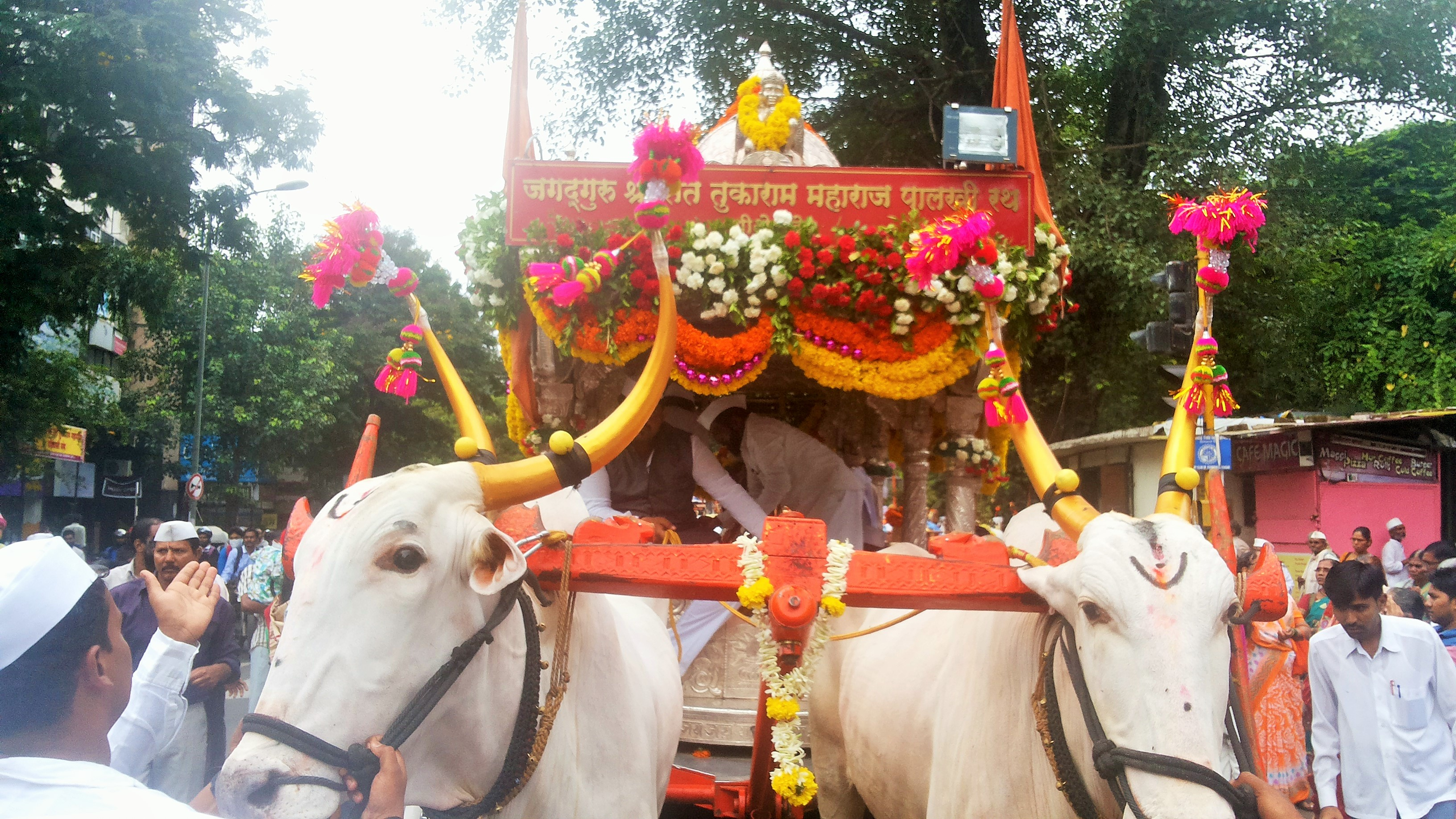
Tukaram Maharaj palkhi (palanquin) Rath

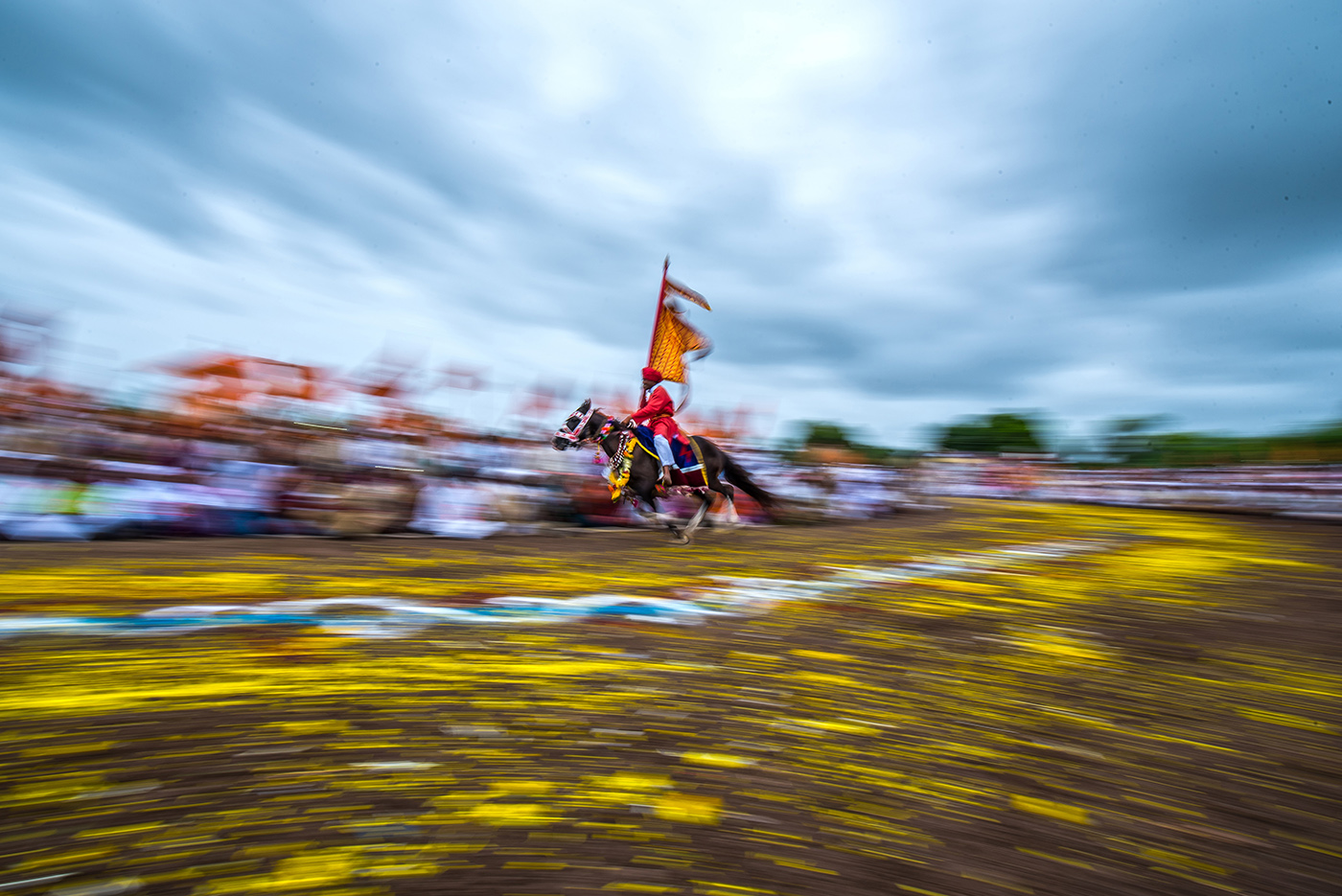
Dnyaneshwar Maharaj Palkhi 2nd Circular ringan. Near, Khudus Phata, Malshiras.

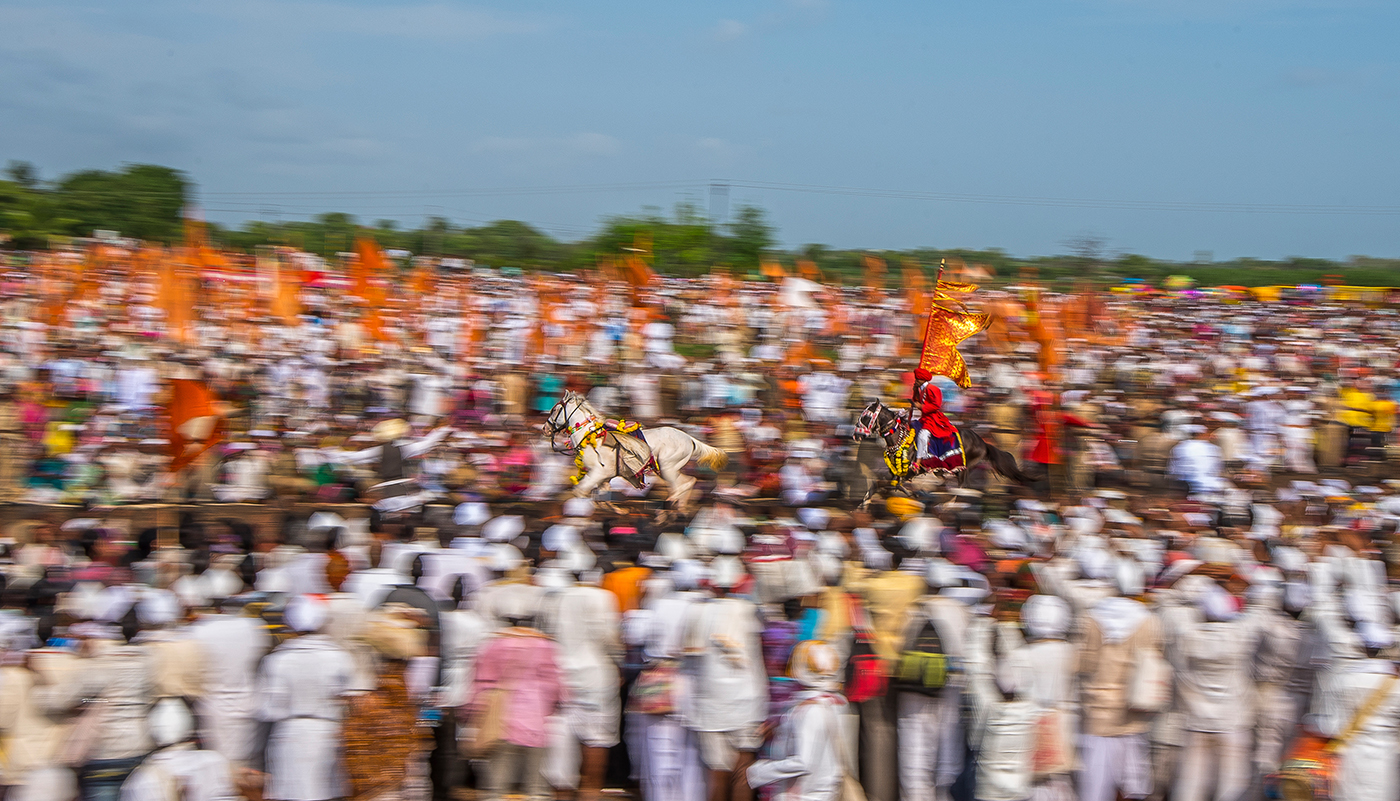
Dnyaneshwar Maharaj Palkhi 3rd Circular ringan. Near, Thakur buva samadhi, Velapur.

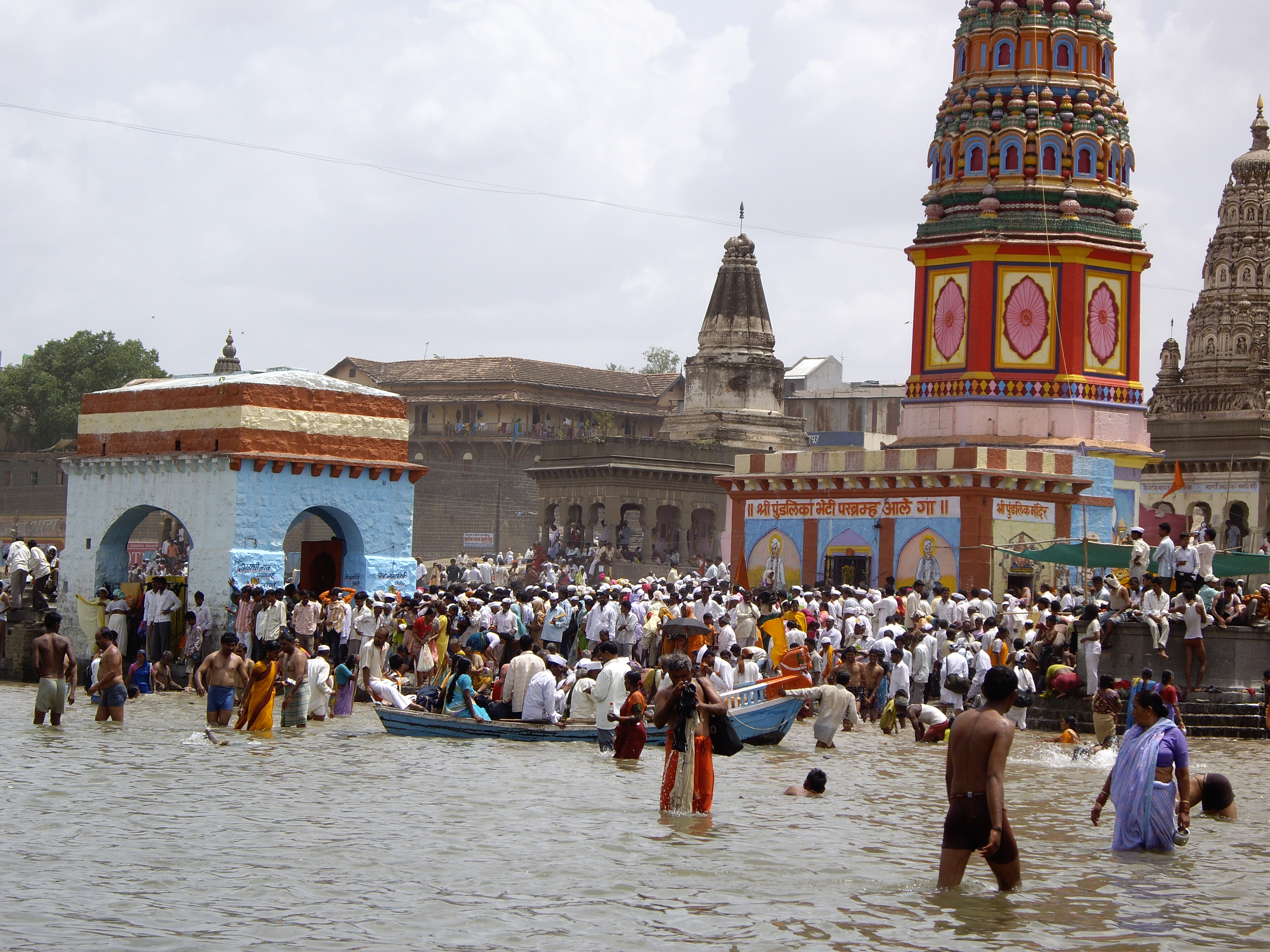
Pilgrims bathing in the Chandrabhaga river at Pandharpur

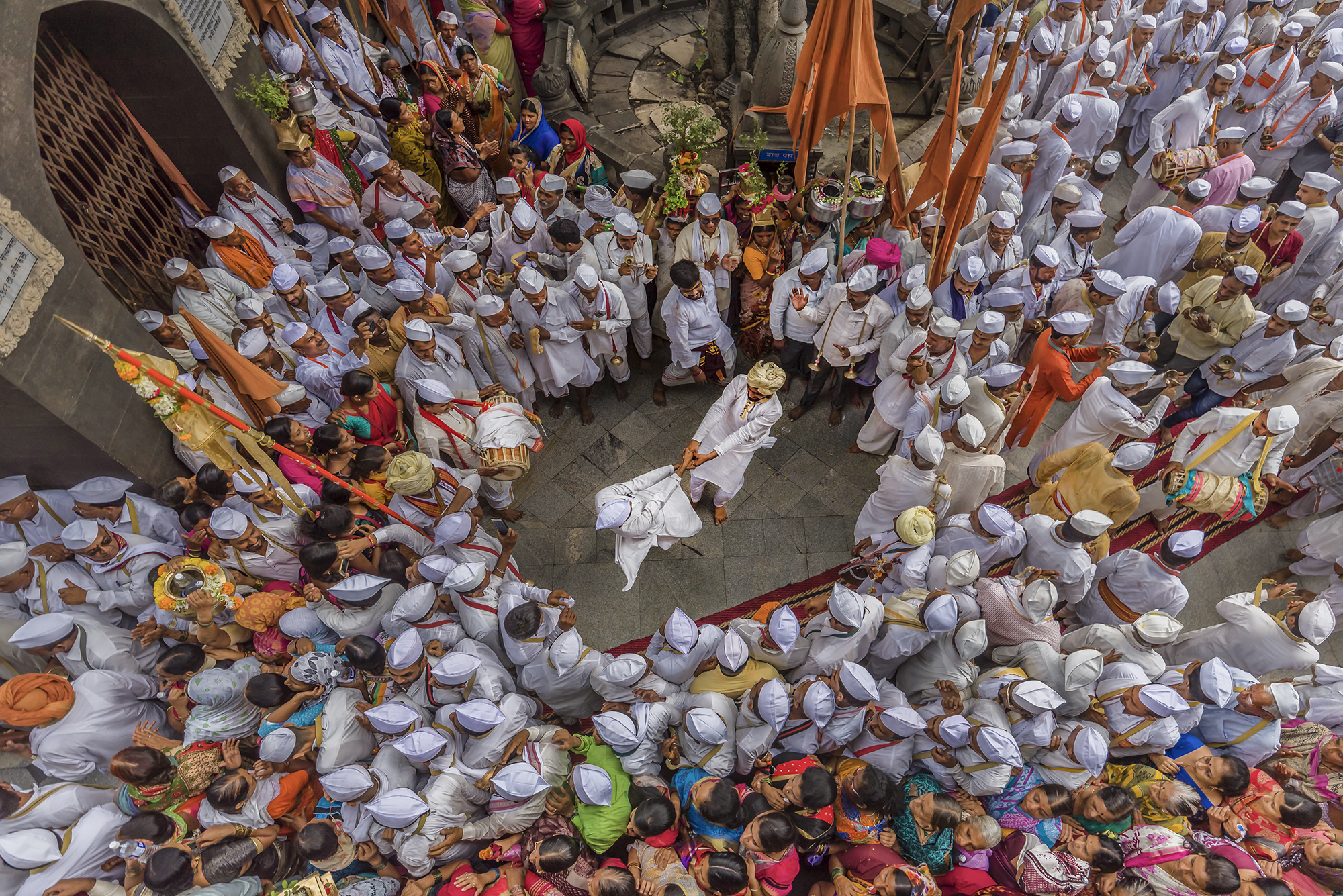
During the Palkhi the Varkaris play Phugadi games in the temple passage.

The Varkaris—whose patron deity is Vithoba—undertake the vari to Pandharpur, reaching there on a day before Shayani Ekadashi, the eleventh lunar day (Ekadashi) of the bright fortnight (Shukla Paksha) of Ashadha (June–July). Pilgrims carry palanquins of the saints from the places of their respective samadhi.

=== Dindi ===
The concept of Dindi (Marathi: दिंडी procession) or troupes of warkari devotees was introduced by Haibatravbaba in the early 1800s. A diṇḍī is a group of Hindu devotees of one caste or village who are part of a larger palkhi going to a holy site on pilgrimage. Some religious institutions and temples also have their own Dindi. Accommodation, meals, and other facilities for warkaris are provided through their respective Dindi. The Managing members of a Dindi usually travel ahead to make arrangements for food and shelter at their next stop. All registered Dindis are numbered and assigned their place in the procession. Some walk in front of the palkhi, and others behind it. During their march, flag and banner-carrying members are at the front of the troupe, and the drummer is at the center of the Dindi.

Along with the procession, sevā is performed for the poor and needy, like dāna. The event is said to be one of the world's largest and oldest movement where people gather on one day each year and walk a distance of around 250 km. The Pandharpur Wari has been classified by the World Book of Records as "one of the most visited places in a day".

== Wari management ==
The Dnyaneshwar palkhi is managed by Haibatraobua Arphalkar's descendants, the hereditary Chopdars, and the Alandi Devasthan Trust.

The wari's schedule is published ahead of time and is strictly followed. It is detailed and minute details are made available, including starting location and the location of breaks, including lunch, rest and night stays. Every morning at early dawn, after worshiping the Saint's ‘Paadukaa/Paduka’(sacred footwear), the palkhi leaves at 6am for the next stretch of the route. A tutari (wind instrument) is blown thrice to alert all Warkaris. At the first signal, all warkaris get ready to leave. At the second signal, the Dindis stand in line and start walking at the third signal. After 4 to 5 km, they take a quick break for breakfast.

== Economic impact ==
An estimated one million pilgrims, either varkaris traveling with the palkhi or independent travelers, travel to Pandharpur each year, who require accommodation provided by the mathas and temporary lodging houses.

== Public health measures ==
Because the wari brings many people on the way to Pandharpur through many localities, public health measures have been implemented since the early British colonial period. These included compulsory vaccinations for diseases, such as cholera and plague, segregation of the infected, and restrictions on mobility. According to Manjiri Kamat, the colonial administrators had other motivations, such as generating revenue by collecting pilgrim tax, or maintaining law and order for implementing public health measures. The colonial government's public health measures in the early part of the 20th century included attaching medical staff to different palkhis, removing infected persons, modifying wells for drinking water, digging trenches, providing bins for waste collection, and employing sanitation staff. The requirement to be vaccinated against cholera and typhoid in order to join a dindi has continued in the present times.

In 2020, due to the COVID-19 pandemic, the wari was reduced with fifty varkaris joining the march to Pandharpur. The Paduka of the saints were either driven to or flown to Pandharpur for Shayani Ekadashi on July 1, 2020.

== Dindi ==
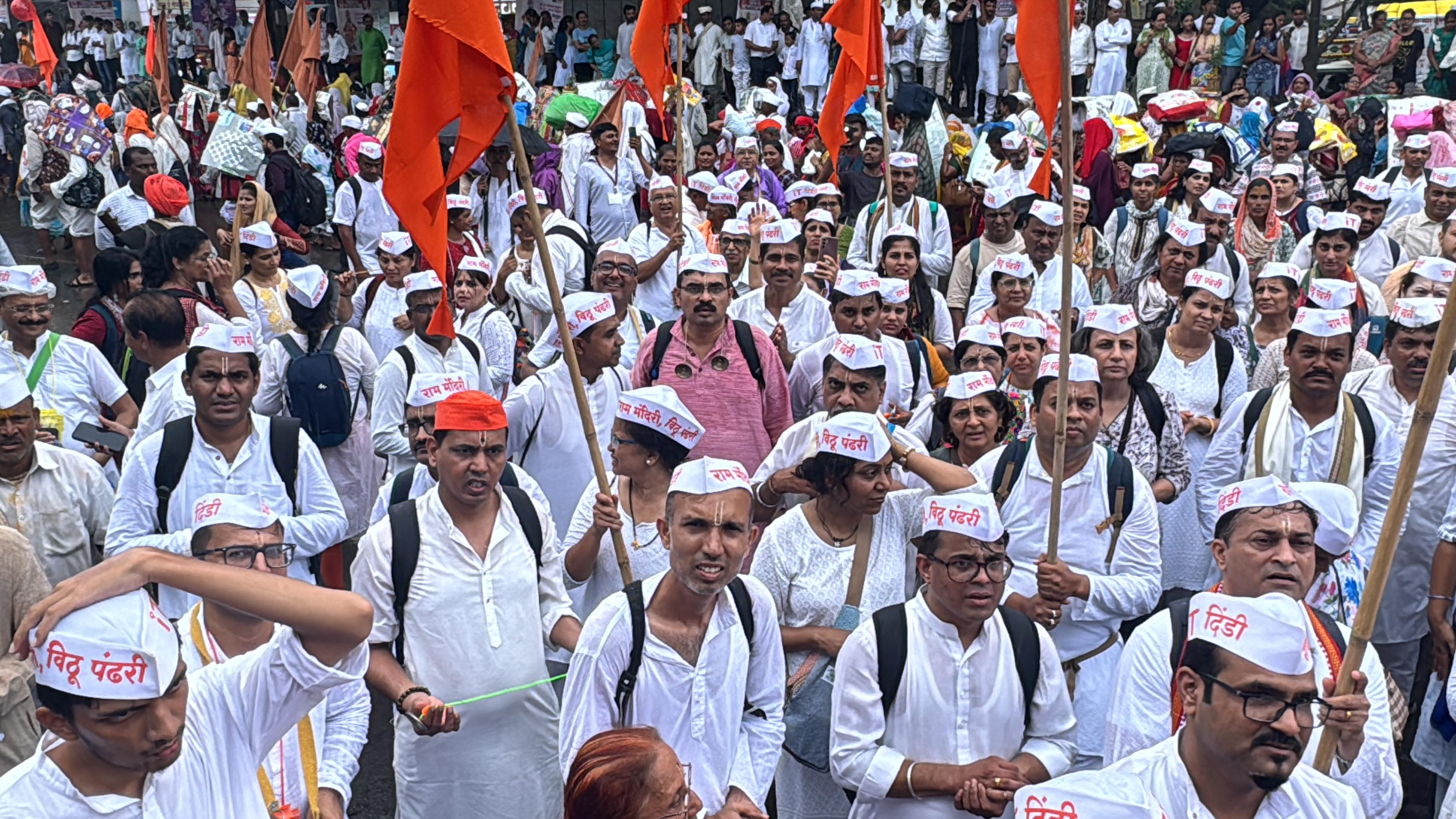
Participants of Dindi walking with devotion during the Pune to Saswad stretch of the Vari

Dindi is a devotional and cultural initiative that blends tradition with technology to enhance participation in the annual Pandharpur Vari. Launched with the intention of offering a safer, more inclusive, and well-organized experience for Varkaris, Dindi aims to preserve the spiritual essence of the Vari while making it easier for people from diverse backgrounds to join the journey. It emphasizes disciplined coordination, safety practices, and community-driven values while supporting the traditional practices followed during the Vari.

To encourage wider participation, Dindi provides flexibility for devotees to join the Vari on any day from Pune to Pandharpur. Participants are offered support in transport, accommodation, meals, and guidance throughout the journey. The initiative has been facilitating this structure for over 18 years and continues to grow as a digitally supported Dindi. Registration and more information can be accessed through their official website, https://aidindi.org.

== Goa Dindi festival ==
The Dindi festival is an annual festival held in Margao, Goa's Vitthal Rakhumai temple, and the Damodar Temple in the month of November. The Dindi festival is dedicated to Hindu deity Vithoba, the festival dates back to 1909. It is one of the oldest festivals in Salcete taluka.

== See also ==
- आषाढी वारी (पंढरपूर) on Marathi Wikipedia
- आषाढी वारी (पंढरपूर) on Hindi Wikipedia
- Bhakti movement
- Dindi dance
- Sant Mat
- Famous Hindu yatras
- Hindu pilgrimage sites in India
- List of Hindu festivals
- Padayatra
- Ratha Yatra
- Tirtha
- Vithoba Temple (section Dindi Yatra)
