= Tukaram =

Hindu Marathi poet-saint

- तुकाराम
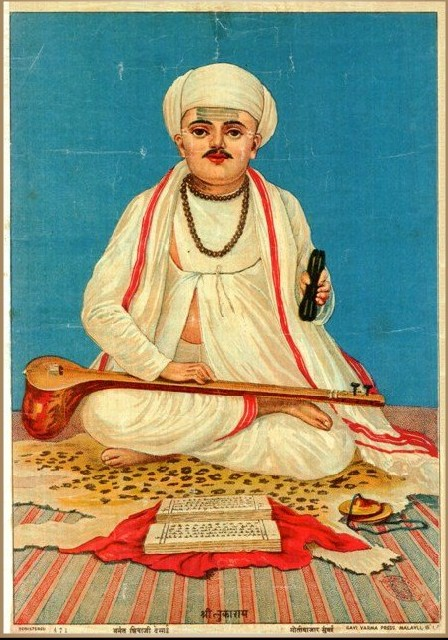
- Tukaram

Personal life
- Born: Tukaram Bolhoba Ambile; Either 1598 or 1608 Dehu, Pune; Maharashtra, India
- Died: Either 1649 or 1650 in Dehu, Pune
- Parents: Bolhoba (father); Kankai (mother)
- Notable work: Tukaram Gatha
- Known for: Abhanga (devotional poetry), Social Reformer -sant of Bhakti movement
- Other names: Tuka, Tukoba, Tukobaraya

Religious life
- Religion: Hinduism
- Order: Varkari tradition
- Dharma name: Sant Tukaram

Tukaram (Marathi pronunciation: [t̪ukaːɾam]), also known as Tuka, Tukobaraya, and Tukoba, was a Hindu Marathi saint of the Varkari Sampradaya who lived in the 17th century. He was a devotee of the god Vithoba, a form of Vishnu. He is best known for his devotional poetry called abhanga, which is popular in Maharashtra. Many of his poems deal with social reform.

== Biography ==
=== Early life ===
Tukaram was born in the modern-day Maharashtra state of India. His name at birth was Tukaram Bolhoba Ambile.

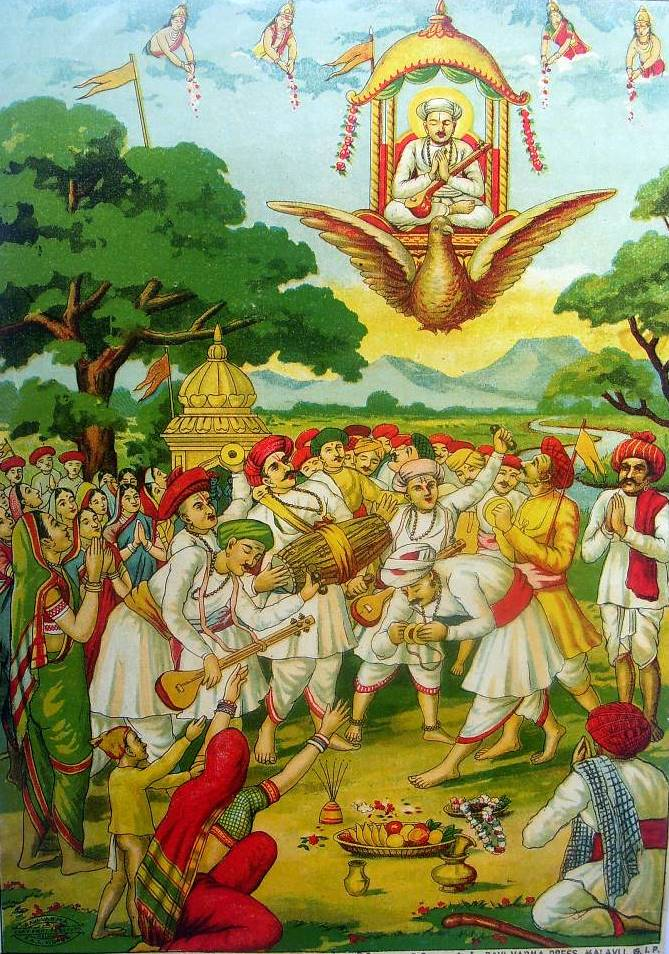
Tukaram is said to have left for Vaikuntha, abode of Vishnu (identified with Vithoba) at the end of his earthly life.

He spent most of his later years in devotional worship, community kirtan (group prayers with singing) and composing abhanga poetry. Tukaram pointed out social injustices, caste hierarchy, and the misconduct of certain religious leaders through his kirtans and abhangas. As a result, he faced opposition from various sections of society. One of his main detractors was Mambaji Gosavi, who ran a matha (monastic establishment) in Dehu and had several followers. Initially, Tukaram entrusted him with the task of performing puja at his temple. However, Mambaji became increasingly jealous of Tukaram’s growing popularity and respect among the villagers. At one point, he attacked Tukaram with a thorn stick and used abusive language against him.

Mambaji continued to oppose Tukaram, blaming him for the loss of traditional abhangas, which conveyed reformist ideas that challenged the dominant Brahmanical orthodoxy. Such views were not widely accepted at the time, particularly by individuals like Mambaji. Ironically, he later became one of Tukaram’s devotees, though only after facing considerable personal humiliation.

Tukaram is also believed to have met Shivaji – the founder of the Maratha Empire; their continued interaction is considered legendary. Eleanor Zelliot notes that poets from the Bhakti movement, including Tukaram, significantly influenced Shivaji’s rise to power. Some accounts even claim that Tukaram once saved Shivaji's life from pursuing Mughal forces.

It is widely accepted by historians that Tukaram died in 1650.

== Philosophy and practices ==
=== Vedanta ===
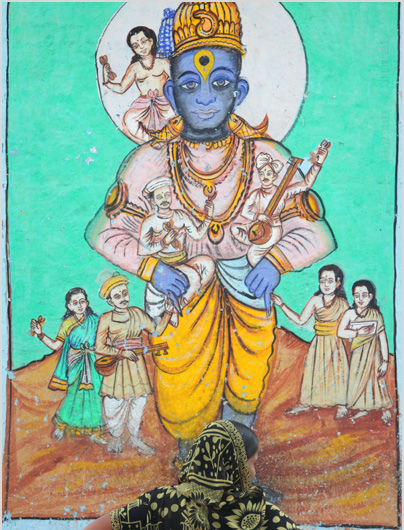
Mural of the god Vithoba with Varkari sants; Tukaram sits on the right arm.

In his abhangas, Tukarama repeatedly refers to four people who had a primary influence on his spiritual development, namely the sants Namdev, Dnyaneshwar, Kabir, and Eknath. Early 20th-century scholars on Tukaram considered his teachings to be Vedanta-based but lacking a systematic theme. JF Edwards wrote,

Tukaram is never systematic in his psychology, his theology, or his theodicy. He oscillates between a Dvaitist [Vedanta] and an Advaitist view of God and the world, leaning now to a pantheistic scheme of things, now to a distinctly Providential, and he does not harmonize them. He says little about cosmogony, and according to him, God realizes Himself in the devotion of His worshippers. Likewise, faith is essential to their realization of Him: 'It is our faith that makes thee a god', he says boldly to his Vithoba.

Late 20th-century scholarship of Tukaram, and translations of his abhanga poem, affirm his pantheistic Vedantic view. Tukaram's abhanga 2877, as translated by Ramchandra Dattatreya Ranade of Nimbal states, for example, "The Vedanta has said that the whole universe is filled by God. All sciences have proclaimed that God has filled the whole world. The Puranas have unmistakably taught the universal immanence of God. The sants have told us that the world is filled by God. Tuka indeed is playing in the world uncontaminated by it like the Sun which stands absolutely transcendent".

Scholars note the often discussed controversy, particularly among Marathi people, whether Tukaram subscribed to the monistic Vedanta philosophy of Adi Shankara. Bhandarkar notes that abhanga 300, 1992 and 2482 attributed to Tukaram are in style and philosophy of Adi Shankara:

When salt is dissolved in water, what is it that remains distinct?
I have thus become one in joy with thee [Vithoba, God] and have lost myself in thee.
When fire and camphor are brought together, is there any black remnant left?
Tuka says, thou and I are one light.

— Tukaram Gatha, 2482, Translated by RG Bhandarkar

However, scholars also note that other abhangas attributed to Tukaram criticize monism, and favor dualistic Vedanta philosophy of the Indian philosophers Madhvacharya and Ramanuja. In abhanga 1471, according to Bhandarkar's translation, Tukaram says, "When monism is expounded without faith and love, the expounder as well as the hearer are troubled and afflicted. He who calls himself Brahma and goes on in his usual way, should not be spoken to and is a buffoon. The shameless one who speaks heresy in opposition to the Vedas is an object of scorn among holy men."

Tukaram denounced mechanical rites, rituals, sacrifices, vows and instead encouraged direct form of bhakti (devotion).

=== Kirtan ===
Tukaram encouraged kirtan as a music imbued, community-oriented group singing and dancing form of bhakti. He considered kirtan not just a means to learn about bhakti, but bhakti itself. The greatest merit in kirtan, according to Tukaram, is it being not only a spiritual path for the devotee, it helps create a spiritual path for others.

=== Social reforms ===
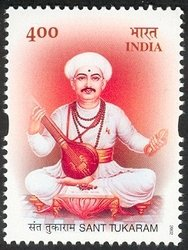
Commemorative Indian stamp depicting Tukaram (2002)

Tukaram accepted disciples and devotees without discriminating on the basis of gender. One of his celebrated devotees was Bahinabai, a Brahmin woman, who faced anger and abuse of her husband when she chose the bhakti path and Tukaram as her guru.

Tukaram taught, states Ranade, that "pride of caste never made any man holy", "the Vedas and Shastras have said that for the service of God, castes do not matter", "castes do not matter, it is God's name that matters", and "an outcast who loves the Name of God is verily a Brahmin; in him have tranquility, forbearance, compassion and courage made their home". However, early 20th century scholars questioned whether Tukaram himself observed caste when his daughters from his second wife married men of their own caste. Fraser and Edwards, in their 1921 review of Tukaram, stated that this is not necessarily so, because people in the West too generally prefer relatives to marry those of their own economic and social strata.

David Lorenzen states that the acceptance, efforts and reform role of Tukaram in the Varkari tradition follows the diverse caste and gender distributions found in Bhakti movements across India. The rest include ten Brahmins and two whose caste origins are unknown. Of the twenty one, four women are celebrated as sant, born in two Brahmin and two non-Brahmin families. Tukaram's effort at social reforms within Varkari tradition must be viewed in this historical context and as part of the overall movement, states Lorenzen.

== Literary works ==
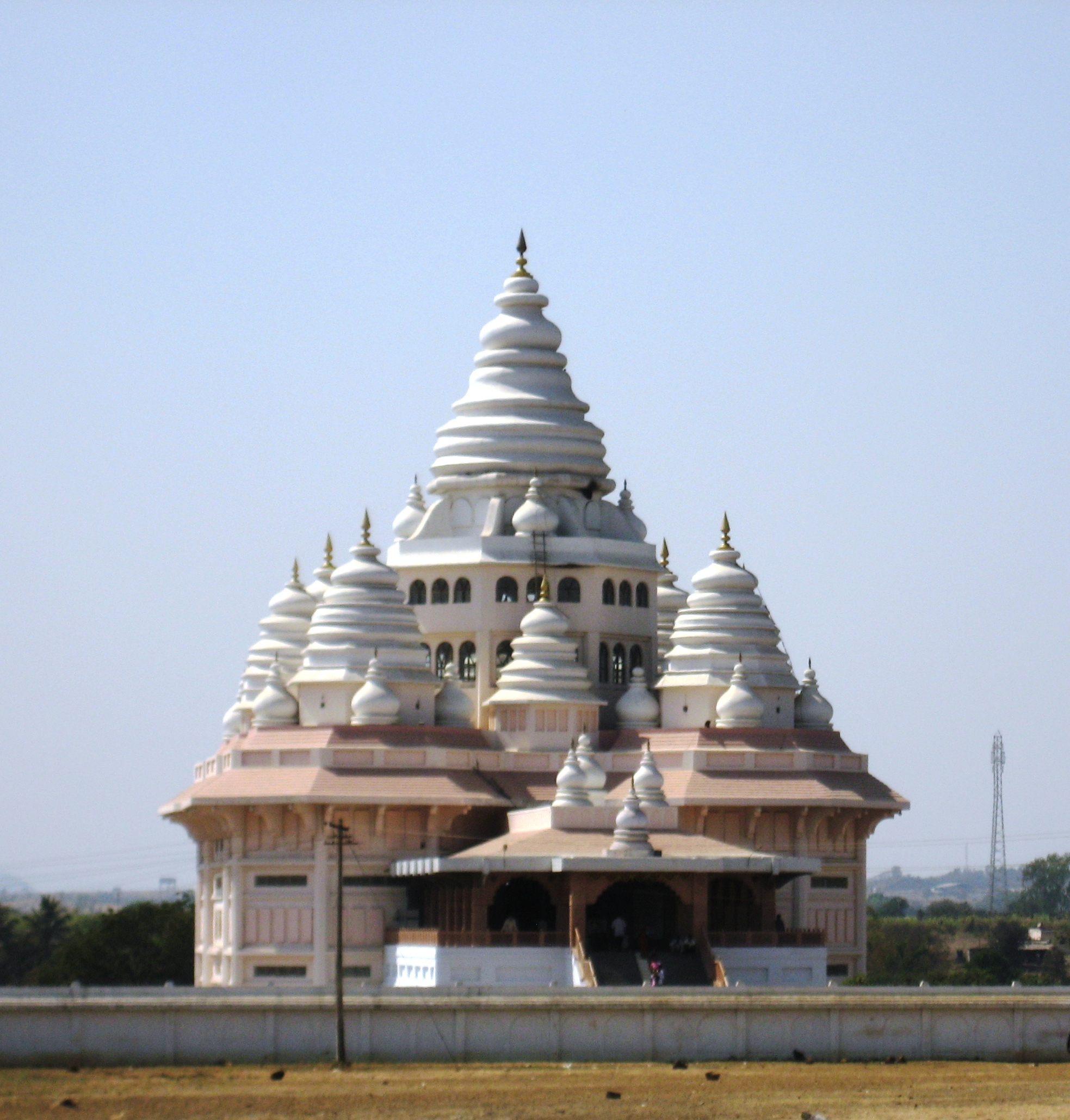
Gatha temple in Dehu, near Pune Maharashtra, is one of two local temples that mark the legacy of Tukaram. His poetry is carved on its wall.

Tukaram composed abhang poetry, a Marathi genre of literature which is metrical (traditionally the ovi meter), simple, direct, and it fuses folk stories with deeper spiritual themes.

Tukaram's work is known for informal verses of rapturous abandon in folksy style, composed in vernacular language, in contrast to his predecessors such as Dnyaneshwar or Namdev known for combining similar depth of thought with a grace of style.

In one of his poems, Tukaram self-effacingly described himself as a "fool, confused, lost, liking solitude because I am wearied of the world, worshipping Vitthal (Vishnu) just like my ancestors were doing but I lack their faith and devotion, and there is nothing holy about me".

Tukaram Gatha is a Marathi language compilation of his works, likely composed between 1632 and 1650. Also called Abhanga Gatha, tradition believes it includes some 4,500 abhangas. The poems considered authentic cover a wide range of human emotions and life experiences, some autobiographical, and places them in a spiritual context. He includes a discussion about the conflict between pravritti – having passion for life, family, business, and nivritti – the desire to renounce, leave everything behind for individual liberation, moksha.

Ranade states there are four major collations of Tukaram's Abhanga Gathas.

=== Authenticity ===
The first compilation of Tukaram poems was published, in modern format, by Indu Prakash publishers in 1869, subsidized by the British colonial government's Bombay Presidency. The 1869 edition noted, "some of the [as received] manuscripts on which the compilation relied, had been 'corrected', 'further corrected' and 'arranged'." This doctoring and rewriting over about 200 years, after Tukaram's death, has raised questions whether the modern compilation of Tukaram's poems faithfully represents what Tukaram actually thought and said, and the historicity of the document. The known manuscripts are jumbled, randomly scattered collections, without chronological sequence, and each contains some poems that are not found in all other known manuscripts.

=== Books and translations ===
The 18th-century biographer Mahipati, in his four volume compilation of the lives of many Bhakti movement sants, included Tukaram. Mahipati's treatise has been translated by Justin Abbott.

A translation of about 3,700 poems from the Tukaram Gatha in English was published, in three volumes, between 1909 and 1915, by Fraser and Marathe. In 1922, Fraser and Edwards published his biography and religious ideas incorporating some translations of Tukaram's poems, and included a comparison of Tukaram's philosophy and theology with those of Christianity. Deleury, in 1956, published a metric French translation of a selection of Tukaram's poem along with an introduction to the religious heritage of Tukaram (Deleury spells him as Toukaram).

Arun Kolatkar published, in 1966, six volumes of avant-garde translations of Tukaram poems. Ranade has published a critical biography and some selected translation.

Dilip Chitre translated writings of Tukaram into English in the book titled Says Tuka for which he was awarded the Sahitya Akademi award in 1994. A selection of poems of Tukaram has been translated and published by Daniel Ladinsky.

Chandrakant Kaluram Mhatre has translated selected poems of Tukaram, published as One Hundred Poems of Tukaram.

== Legacy ==
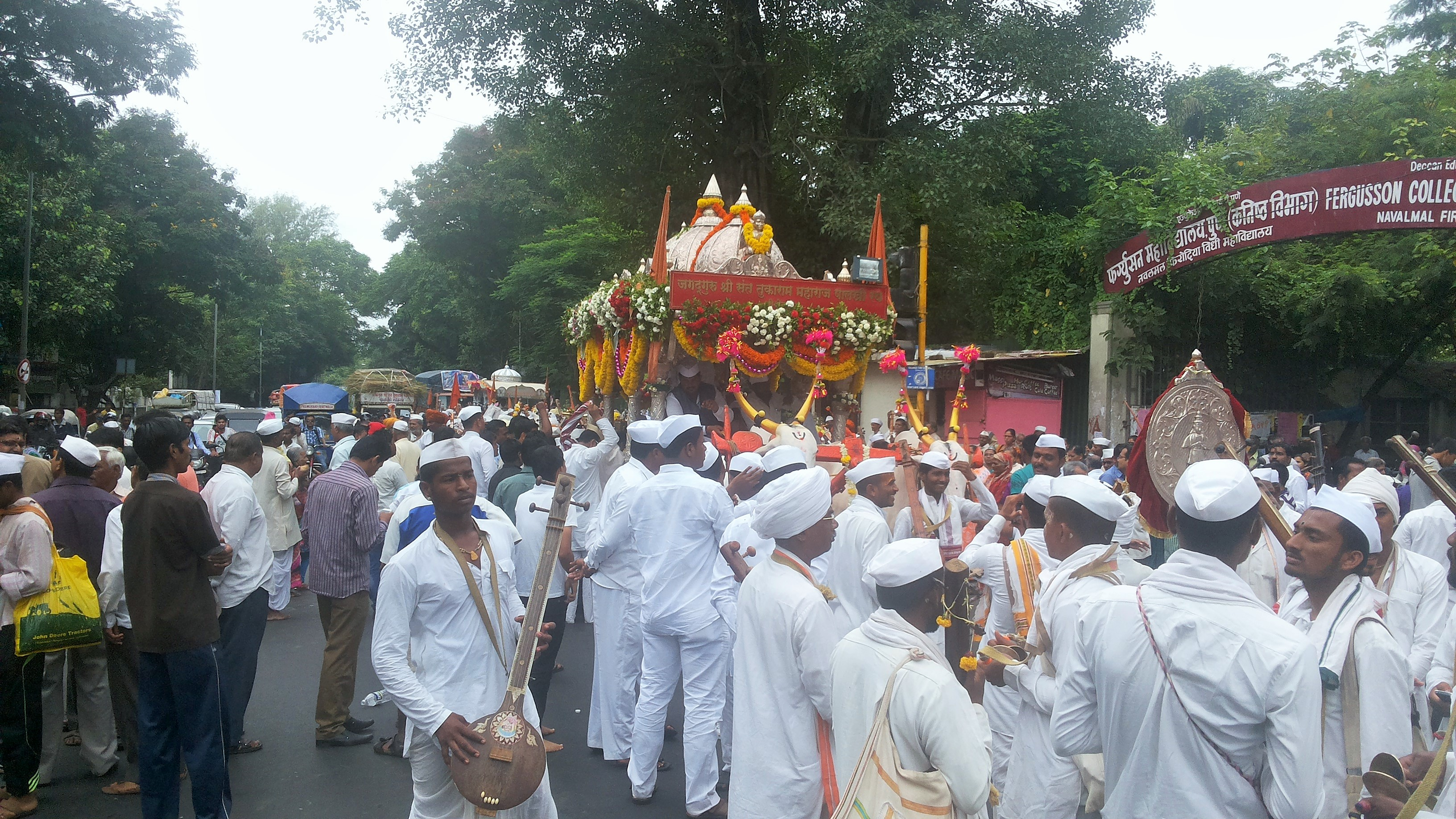
Varkaris annually journey to Vithoba's central temple in Pandharpur with Palkhi procession holding the symbolic paduka (footprints) of Tukaram

=== Maharashtra society ===
Tukaram's abhangas are very popular in Maharashtra. It became part of the culture of the state. Varkaris, poets and peoples study his poems. His poems are popular in rural Maharashtra and their popularity is increasing. Tukaram was a devotee of Vithoba (Vitthala), an avatar of Vishnu, but with regional style and features. Tukaram's literary works, along with those of sants Dnyaneshwar, Namdev and Eknath, states Mohan Lal, are credited to have propelled Varkari tradition into pan-Indian Bhakti literature.

According to Richard Eaton, from early 14th-century when Maharashtra region came under the rule of the Delhi Sultanate, down to the 17th century, the legacy of Tukaram and his poet-predecessors, "gave voice to a deep-rooted collective identity among Marathi-speakers". Dilip Chitre summarizes the legacy of Tukaram and Bhakti movement sants, during this period of Hindu-Muslim wars, as transforming "language of shared religion, and religion a shared language. It is they who helped to bind the Marathas together against the Mughals on the basis not of any religious ideology but of a territorial cultural identity".

=== Mahatma Gandhi ===
Mahatma Gandhi, in early 20th century, while under arrest in Yerawada Central Jail by the British colonial government for his non-violent movement, read and translated Tukaram's poetry along with Upanishads, Bhagavad Gita and poems by other Bhakti movement poet-saints.

Saintliness is not to be purchased in shops,
nor is it to be had for wandering, nor in cupboards, nor in deserts, nor in forests
It is not obtainable for a heap of riches. It is not in the heavens above, nor in the entrails of the earth below.
Tuka says: It is a life's bargain, and if you will not give your life to possess it, better be silent.

The essence of the endless Vedas is this: Seek the shelter of God and repeat His name with all thy heart.
The result of the cogitations of all the Shastras is also the same.
Tuka says: The burden of the eighteen Puranas is also identical.

Merit consists in doing good to others, sin in doing harm to others. There is no other pair comparable to this.
Truth is the only freedom; untruth is bondage, there is no secret like this.
God's name on one's lips is itself salvation, disregarding the name is perdition.
Companionship of the good is the only heaven, indifference is hell.
Tuka says: It is thus clear what is good and what is injurious, let people choose what they will.

— Tukaram, Translated by Mahatma Gandhi

Tukaram also had a profound influence on K. B. Hedgewar as the former's quotes often found their way on the latter's letterhead. One such letter dated April 6, 1940 bore the quote "Daya tiche nanwa bhutanche palan, aanik nirdalan kantkache", meaning compassion is not only the welfare of all living beings, but also includes protecting them from harm's way.

=== Places associated with Tukaram ===
Places associated with Tukaram in Dehu that exist today are:

- Tukaram Maharaj Janm Sthan Temple, Dehu – place where Tukaramji was born, around which a temple was built later
- Sant Tukaram Vaikunthstan Temple, Dehu – from where Tukaram ascended to Vaikuntha (Abode of God) in his mortal form; there is a beautiful ghat behind this temple along the Indrayani River
- Sant Tukaram Maharaj Gatha Mandir, Dehu – modern structure; massive building housing a big statue of Tukaram; In the Gatha temple, about 4,000 abhangas (verses) created by Tukaram were carved on the walls.

=== Movies and popular culture ===
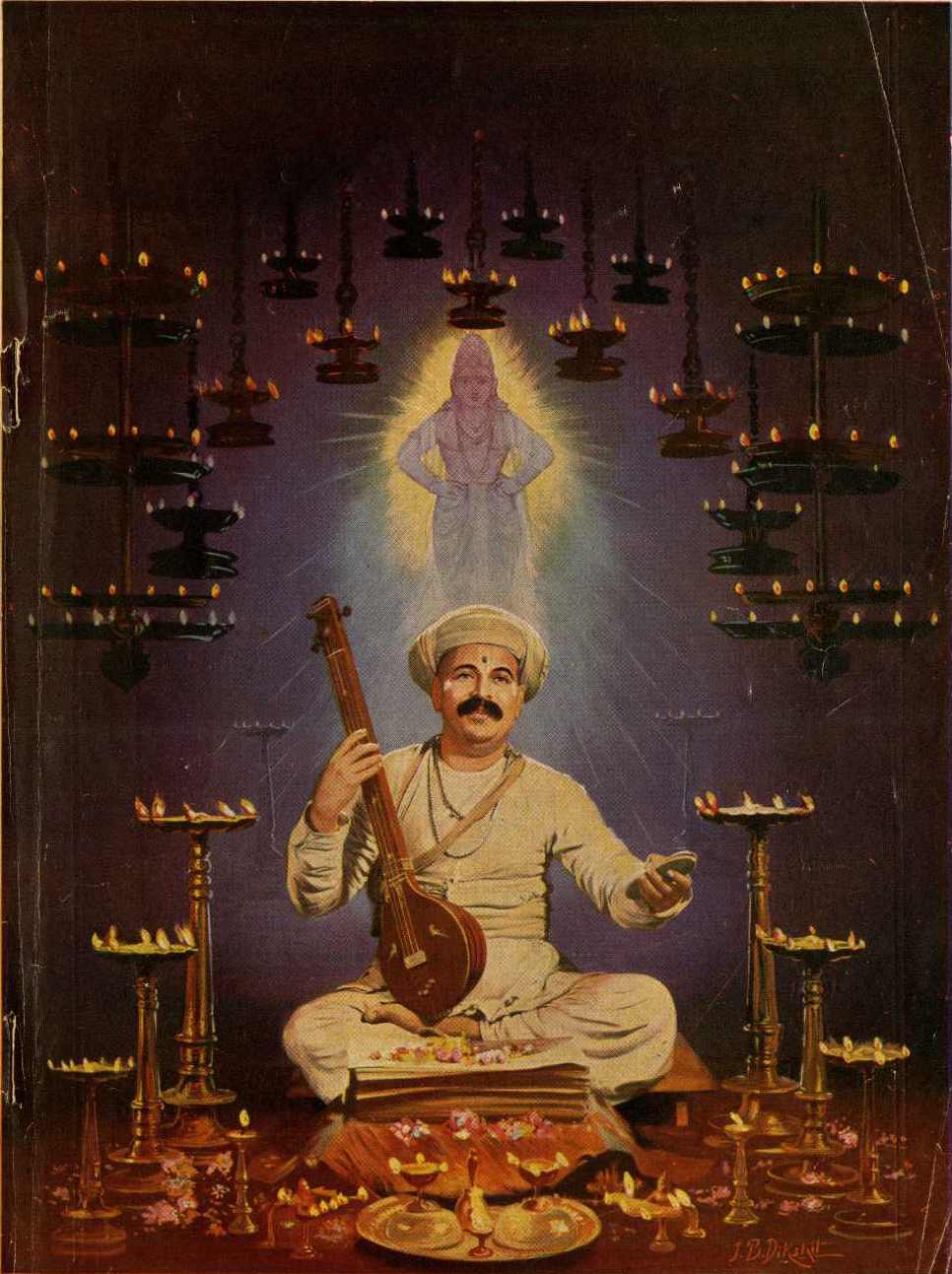
Poster of Tukaram (1936).

A number of Indian films have been made about the saint in different languages. These include:

- Tukaram (1921) silent film by Shinde.
- Sant Tukaram (1921) silent film by Kalanidhi Pictures.
- Sant Tukaram (1936) – this movie on Tukaram was screened open-air for a year, to packed audiences in Mumbai, and numerous rural people would walk very long distances to see it.
- Thukkaram (1938) in Tamil by B. N. Rao.
- Santha Thukaram (1963) in Kannada
- Sant Tukaram (1965) in Hindi
- Bhakta Tukaram (1973) in Telugu
- Tukaram (2012) in Marathi
- Sant Tukaram (2025) in Hindi
- abhanga Tukaram (2025) in Marathi

Tukaram's life was the subject of the 68th issue of Amar Chitra Katha, India's largest comic book series.

Balbharti has included a poem of Tukaram in a Marathi school textbook

The government of India had issued a 100 rupee Silver commemorative coin in 2002.

== See also ==
- Bhakti movement
- Pandharpur Vari – the largest annual pilgrimage in Maharashtra that includes a ceremonial Palkhi of Tukaram
- Vithoba Temple
- Dnyaneshwar
