= One Hundred Poems of Tukaram =

2015 book by Sant Tukaram

- Cover page
- Author: Sant Tukaram
- Translator: Chandrakant Kaluram Mhatre
- Language: marathi
- Genre: Poetry
- Publication date: 2015
- Publication place: India
- ISBN: 9781483549392

One Hundred Poems of Tukaram is a 2015 book consisting of selected poems of Sant Tukaram, a prominent Varkari Sant and spiritual poet of the Bhakti, translated into English by Chandrakant Kaluram Mhatre. The book also consists of an introduction by the translator, which explores aspects like relevance of Tukaram's poetry in twenty-first century, Tukaram's life and times, Varkari movement of which Tukaram was a part and the form of Tukaram's poems amongst other things. It aims at historicising Tukaram's poetry while upholding its timeless appeal. The book covers a wide range of poems depicting the spiritual as well as worldly journey of the saint-poet who is widely hailed as one of the greatest poets from India by critics like Ramchandra Ranade and Dr. Sadanand More. Selection of poems is such that the book gives a comprehensive picture of the various phases of Sant Tukaram's life which can be generally divided into that of a family man, a recluse and the man of the masses. So far this is only the second book-length translation of Tukaram's poems in English, the other being Dilip Chitre's Says Tuka (1991).

== Poems ==
One Hundred Poems of Tukaram is a first book-length attempt at reproducing the original form of Tukaram's poems viz. abhang into English. As a poetic form, abhang has been explored by all Varkari saints for their poetic expressions. An abhang can be of two types: four-lined stanzaic and two-lined stanzaic. Tukaram has exploited both these forms of abhang extensively in his poems as is illustrated by a few poems given below, extracted from One Hundred Poems of Tukaram:

1.

Words are the jewels

That our homes are filled with

The tools that we strive with

Are but of words

Words are the source

That sustains our life

Wealth of words we give

To one and all

Tuka says behold

Word is the Lord

Let us praise Him

Worship with words

2.

The destitute and the downtrodden

Who considers as his own

He alone is to be recognised as Saint

God is to be experienced only therewith

Tender through and through is butter

So is the heart of the good

Those who are forsaken

He takes them in loving embrace

Mercy meant for own son

He shows to servants and maids too

Tuka says can't praise him enough

He is the Lord incarnate

== Quotes from the book ==
- "Trees, creepers are our | Kindred, also wild beasts

And birds singing | Melodiously"

- "Compassion be called | Protecting beings

Along with eradicating | Evildoers"

- "The meaning of Vedas | We alone comprehend

Others only carry | Burdens on head"

- "Flame of a firefly | Tuka says can't light a lamp"
- "Tuka says faith | Makes the Lord incarnate"

== See also ==
- Marathi poetry
- Indian literature
- Sant Mat
- Bhakti literature
