= Vithoba Temple =

Temple in Pandharpur, Maharashtra, India

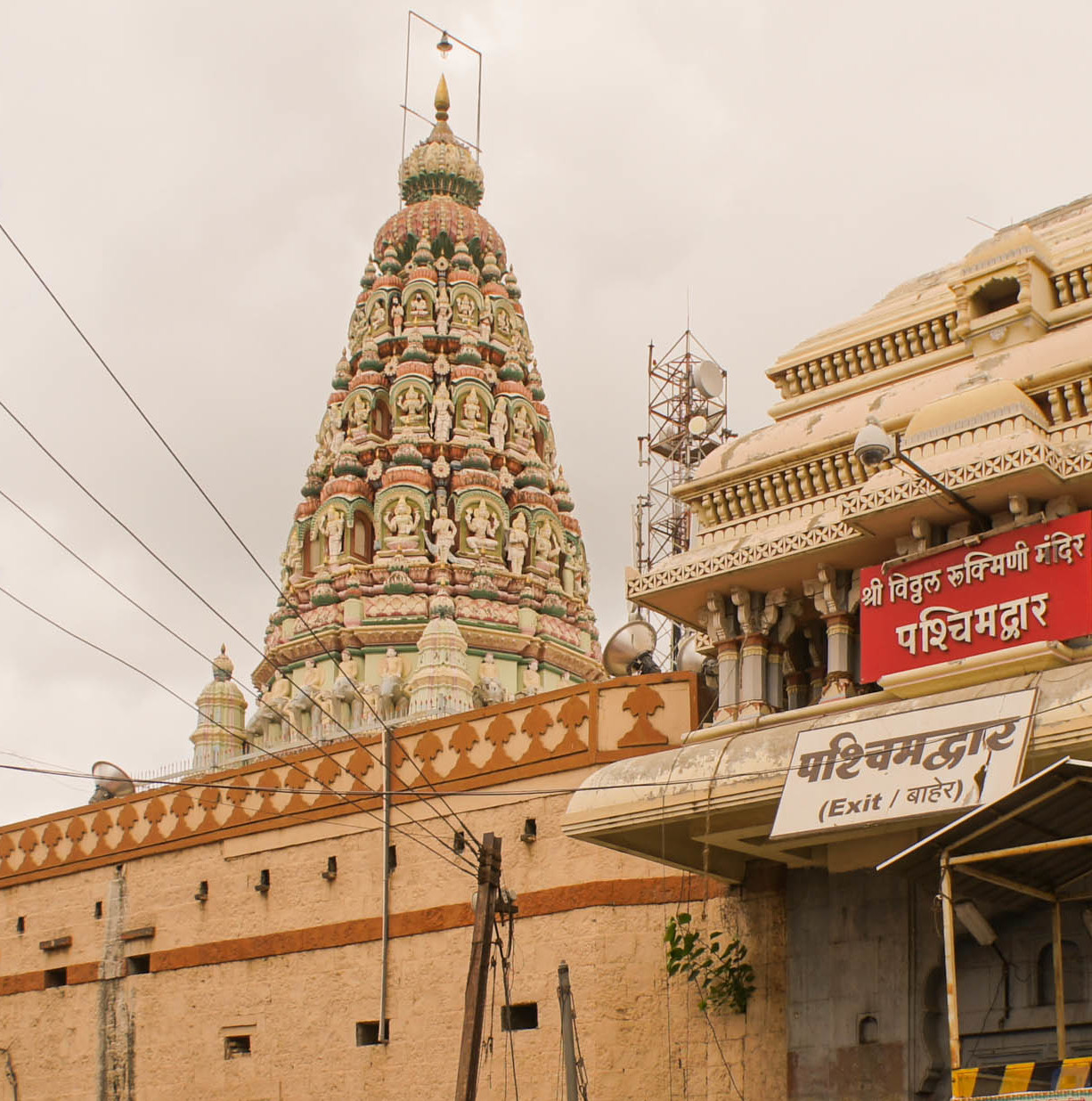
- Shri Vitthal-Rukmini Mandir

- Location in Maharashtra

Religion
- Affiliation: Hinduism
- District: Solapur
- Deity: Vithoba Rakhumai
- Festivals: Aashadhi Ekadashi, Kartiki Ekadashi.

Location
- Location: Pandharpur
- State: Maharashtra
- Country: India
- Coordinates: 17.67°N 75.33°E

Architecture
- Type: Bhumija architecture
- Completed: 1108–1152 CE

The Vithoba Temple, officially known as Shri Vitthal-Rukmini Mandir (Marathi: श्री विठ्ठल-रूक्मिणि देऊळ Kannada: ಶ್ರೀ ವಿಠ್ಠಲ-ರುಕ್ಮಿಣಿ ದೇವಸ್ಥಾನ) is a Hindu temple in Pandharpur, in the Indian state of Maharashtra. It is the main centre of worship for Vithoba, a form of the god Vishnu, and his consort Rakhumai. It is one of the 108 Abhimana Kshethram of Vaishnavate tradition. The temple was built by King Vishnuvardhana (Bittideva) of Hoysala Empire between 1108 and 1152 CE upon being convinced by the historical figure Pundalik. Also, there is an inscription in the temple, of a Hoysala King Vira Someshwara dating back to 1237 CE, which grants the temple a village for its upkeep. It is the most visited temple in Maharashtra. The Warkaris start marching from their homes to the temple of Pandharpur in groups called Dindi (procession) to reach on Aashadhi Ekadashi and Kartiki Ekadashi. A dip in the holy river Chandrabhaga, on whose banks Pandharpur resides, is believed to have power to wash all sins. All the devotees are allowed to touch the feet of the idol of Vithoba. In 2014, the Vithoba Temple became the first in India to accept women and people from lower castes as priests.

Although parts of the temple date to the 12th or 13th century, the existing structure mainly dates to the 17th century or later, and reflects the later Deccan style, with dome motifs and lobed arches. Attempts were made to destroy the temple by Afzal Khan, however the original central figure of the shrine was protected by the Brahmin priests Badve while Afzalkhan destroyed a similar idol.

== History ==
Worship of the god Vithoba, or Vitthala, began in Karnataka before spreading to Pandharpur. The spread of Vithoba worship to Pandharpur is traditionally attributed to Pundalika, a semi-legendary figure who, according to archaeologists M. S. Mate and Madhukar Keshav Dhavalikar, probably lived no earlier than the 12th century.

An inscription in the Vithoba temple, dated to the year 1189, states that a small shrine to Vithoba was set up on the site of the current temple that year for the first time. Thus, according to Shima Iwao, the origins of Vithoba worship at Pandharpur cannot be much older than this period. Another inscription, dated to the year 1237, describes the construction of a temple gateway by the reigning monarch. The first epigraphic evidence of an association between Pandharpur and a Puṇḍarīkamuni also dates from 1237. Further inscriptions dated to 1273-77 record the construction of a temple to Vithoba on the site of the earlier shrine — that is, on the site of the present temple.

From the 1200s onward, various religious figures incorporated Vithoba worship into the broader bhakti movement. These included Jñāneśvara, who lived in the late 1200s; Nāmadeva, who lived in the 1200s and 1300s; Ekanātha in the 1500s; and Tukārāma in the 1600s. These early accounts only say that Vithoba came to Pandharpur "for the sake of Pundalika"; the full story, where Vithoba comes to Pandharpur because he is impressed by Pundalika's devotion to his parents and then agreeing to stay, does not appear until Bāhiṇabāī's Puṇḍalīka-māhātmya in the 1600s.

Although parts of the temple date to the 12th or 13th century, the existing structure mainly dates to the 17th century or later, and reflects the later Deccan style, with dome motifs and lobed arches.

In May 2014, the temple became the first in India to invite women and people from backward castes as priests.

== Description of the temple ==
At the front gate of the Viṭhobā temple is a small samādhi shrine honouring Chokhāmeḷā, and just inside the gate is a bust of Nāmadeva. Visitors pay their respects to these two Hindu sants, and then go up the stairs into the temple. Inside, visitors worship Viṭhobā along with various other deities, who are mostly but not exclusively affiliated with Vishnu.

The temple of Viṭhobā is divided into six main areas. The first area is the smaller Mukti Mandapa, followed by the larger Sabhā Mandapa (assembly hall), which contains images of Dattātreya, Garuḍa, and Hanumān. Beyond the Sabhā Mandapa and up some stairs is the Solākhāṃbi, a medium-sized hall with 16 pillars, followed by the Caukhāṃbi, a smaller hall with 4 pillars. At the back of the Caukhāmbi is a small chamber, at "the deepest recess and highest location of the temple", where the mūrti of Viṭhobā himself is enshrined. Visitors bow before the image of the god and receive the priests' blessings before proceeding to a couple of small rooms off to the side where they worship Rukmiṇī, Mahālakṣmī, and Veṅkaṭeśvara. Finally, devotees go into other small rooms to worship several other deities, "as deemed appropriate": Ambā, a local tutelary goddess; Rāmeśvara Śiva, a linga supposedly placed by Rāma; Rāma himself, along with his brother Lakṣmaṇa; Sūrya, the sun god; Rādhā; Satyabhāmā; a snake god named Nāgobā; Narasiṃha, the man-lion avatar of Vishnu; Kālabhairava, a fierce form of Shiva; and several others.

== Significance ==
The Vithoba Temple in Pandharpur is the "focal point" of the Vārkarī religious tradition that worships Viṭhobā. The temple is central to Pandharpur's importance as a religious and cultural centre in Maharashtra.

== Daily ceremonies ==
There are five main daily ceremonies performed at the Vithoba Temple. First is the kākaḍāratī, to awaken Vithoba, at 3 AM. This is followed immediately by the pañcāmṛtapūjā, where the mūrti of Vithoba is bathed with "five kinds of sweet goods" (i.e. the panchamrita): milk, curds, ghee, honey, and sugar. The mūrti is also dressed as part of this ceremony. This marks the beginning of normal visiting hours when devotees are allowed to view the image. At noon is madhyāhṇapūjā, providing a private midday meal for the god (thus visitors are not allowed to see the image during this period), and then at sundown is aparāhṇapūjā, for providing dinner. Finally, at 10 PM, is the śejāratī, for putting the mūrti to sleep, after which visitors are no longer allowed to view the mūrti.

== Annual observances ==
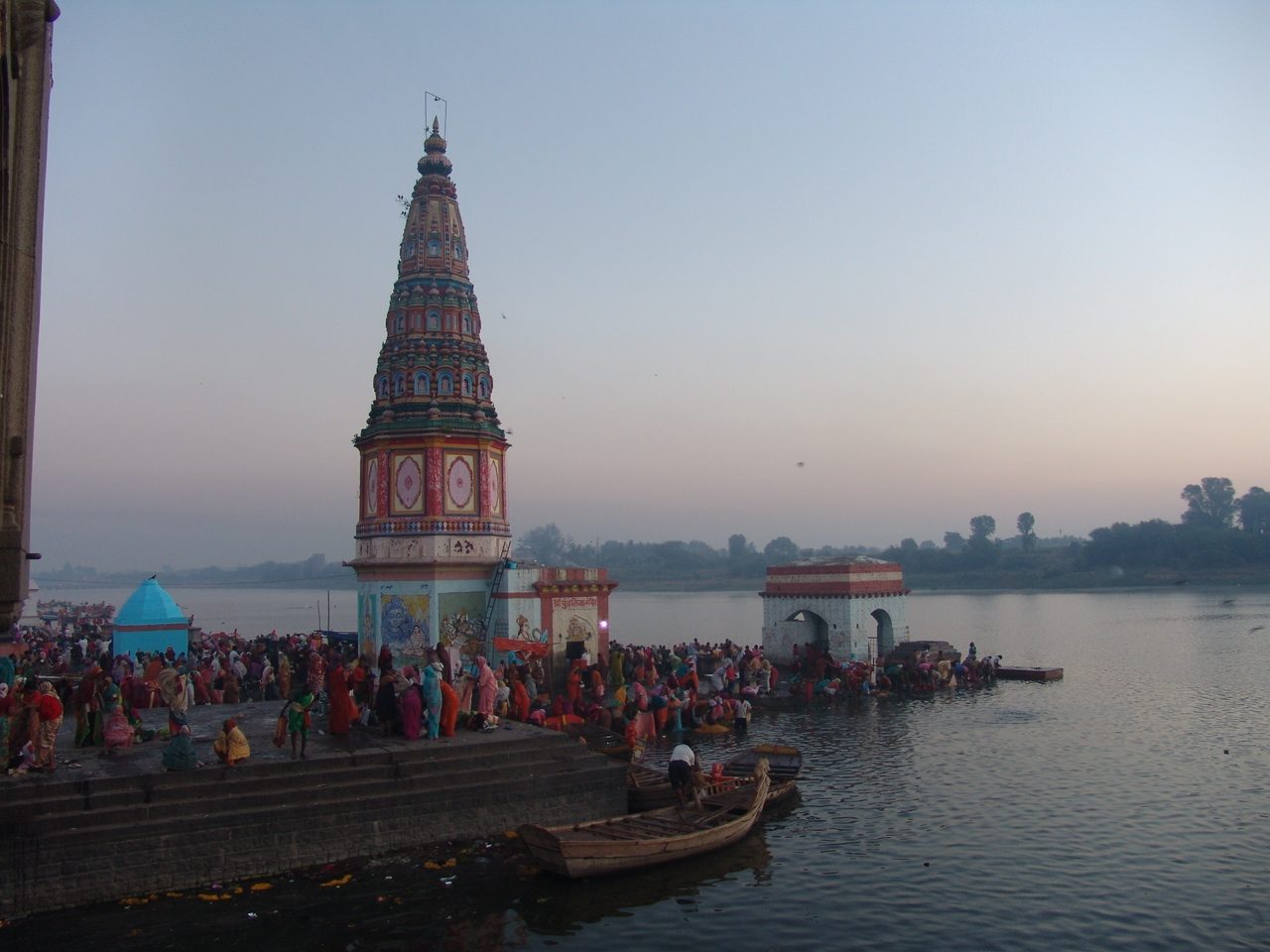
Chandrabaga river

The biggest events are the pilgrimages in Āṣāḍha and Kārtika, on the 11th through 15th of each month. Ordinarily, visitors are only allowed to view the image of Viṭhobā during the day (i.e. between pañcāmṛtapūjā and śejāratī), but during pilgrimage season, they are allowed to do so at any time of day or night — śejāratī is not performed throughout this period. At the end of this period, a ceremony called prakṣālapūjā, where the image of Vithoba is washed to refresh the god. On the day of Raṅgapañcamī, after Holi, people sprinkle red powder on the feet of the mūrti. Finally, in observance of Gokulāṣṭamī, or Kṛṣṇāṣṭamī, people celebrate by singing and dancing in front of Viṭhobā's image for nine days.

== Temple management ==
The temple is administered by a committee of Deshastha Brahmins, known as baḍavā, who are in charge of all financial assets of the temple and who oversee the various rituals and events held here. They are not the ones who actually perform the rituals, though; that is done by various other priests.

== Legends associated with the temple ==
=== Pundalik ===
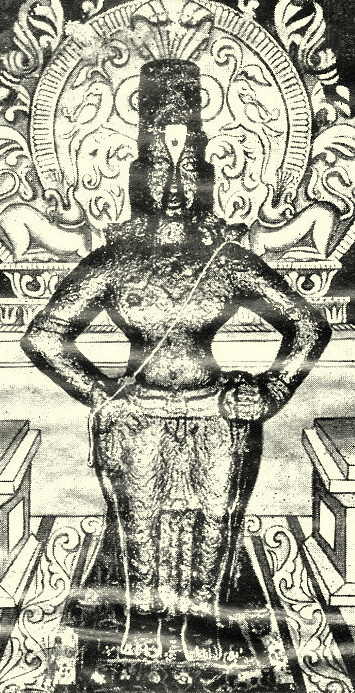
The central image of Vithoba

Pundalik is a devoted son to his parents Janudev and Satyavati, who lived in a forest called Dandirvan. But after his wedding, Pundalik begins ill-treating his parents. Tired with their son's misbehavior and ill treatment, the elderly couple decide to leave for Kashi. Legend holds that people who die in the city of Kashi attain salvation and emancipation from the cycle of birth and death. Many Hindus would relocate to Kashi before they died.

Upon hearing his parents' plans, Pundalik and his wife decide to join them on pilgrimage. The ill treatment continues. While the Pundalik and his wife ride on horseback, his parents walk. Pundalik even makes his old parents work to make his own journey comfortable. Every evening, when the party camps for the night, the son forces his parents to groom the horses and do other jobs.

On the way to Kashi, the group reached the ashram (hermitage) of a pious and venerable sage, Kukkutswami. Exhausted, the family decides to spend a few days there. That night, when all were asleep, Pundalik by chance is awake and sees a remarkable vision. Just before dawn, a group of beautiful young women, dressed in soiled clothes, enter the ashram; they clean the floor, fetch water and wash the venerable sage's clothes. After finishing their chores, they go to the prayer-room. When they reappear after prayer, their clothes are spotlessly clean. Then, they vanish as inexplicably as they had appeared.

Pundalik feels a deep sense of peace witnessing the scene. It remains on his mind the whole day and he resolves to remain awake the next night, and confirm it was not merely a dream. The next night, Pundalik approaches the beautiful women and asks who they are. They reveal themselves as the Ganga (Ganges), Yamuna and other holy rivers of India. Pilgrims wish to take a dip in their holy waters to wash away their sins, which in fact are soiling their clothes. Then, the women say: "But O Pundalik, you, with your ill-treatment of your parents, are the greatest sinner of them all!" Pundalik realizes his misdeeds, becomes entirely devoted to his parents and ensures their comfort, even risking his own.

Impressed by Pundalik's devotion to his parents, Krishna plans to bless Pundalik immediately. So, he left (His abode) for Pundalik's ashram. Krishna knocks at Pundalik's door while he is busy serving his parents food. Pundalik realizes that God is at his door but decides to serve his parents first. So, Pundalik throws a brick outside for God to stand on and wait for him until he finishes attending to his parents. It is the first day of monsoon so it is wet and muddy outside. If Vishnu stands upon a brick his feet will remain clean and dry.

Seeing this act, Krishna was extremely impressed by Pundalik's love for his parents and granted a boon. Pundalik requests Krishna to stay on Earth and bless all his true devotees. Krishna agrees to stay and takes the form of Vithoba. Currently, the deity resides in the Vithoba temple and is worshipped alongside Rukmini, his chief consort.

=== Sant Namdeva Maharaj Payari ===
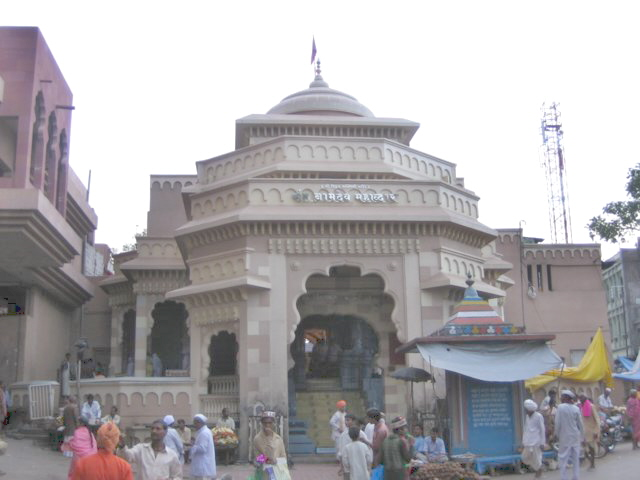
Chief (eastern) entrance of the temple, which houses the "Sant Namdev Maharaj Pāyari". The small blue temple in front of the gate is saint Chokhamela's memorial.

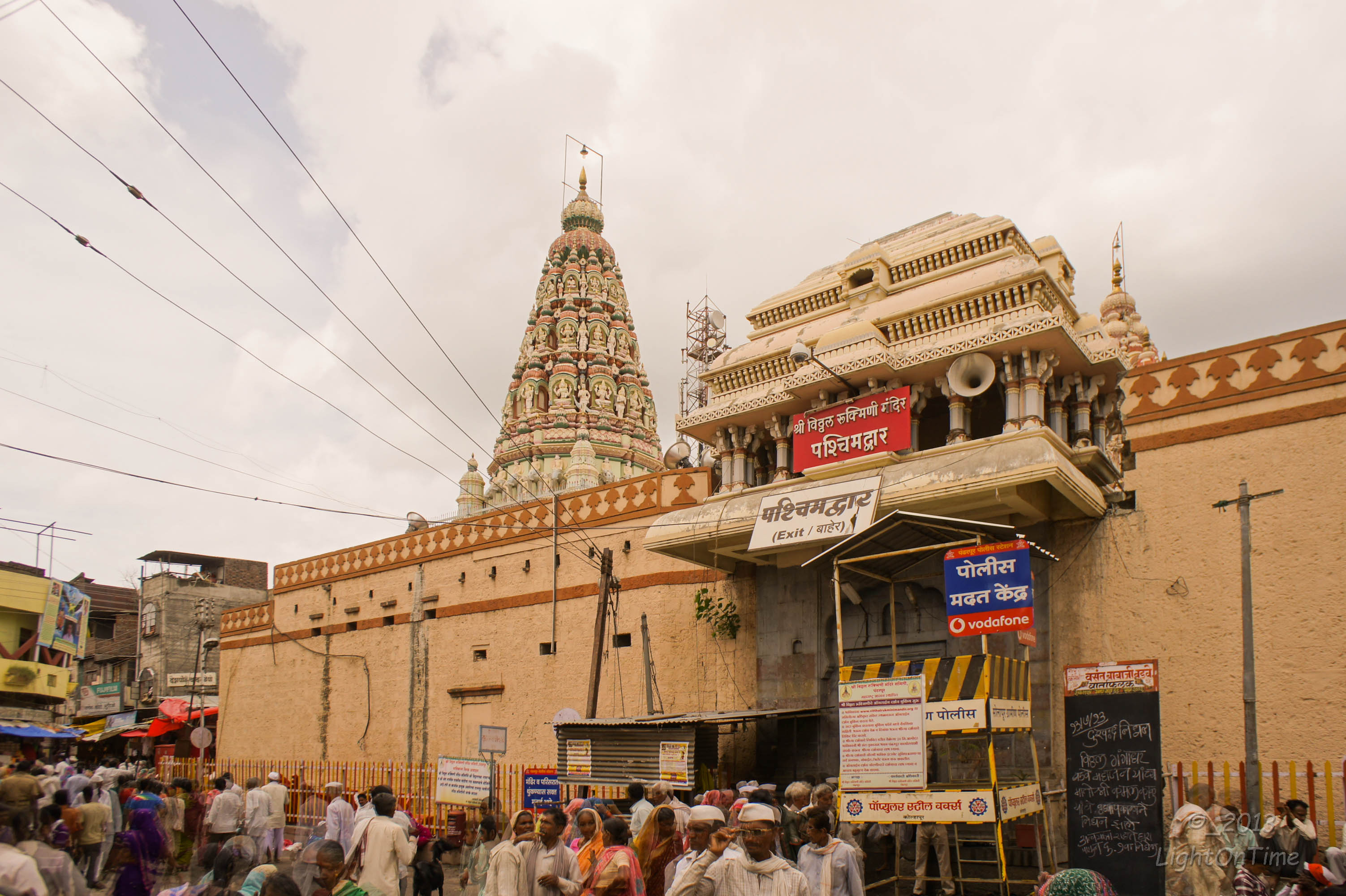
The exit for pilgrims; with the shikhara of Rakhumai's cella seen

An interesting tale is that of the temple's first step called "Sant Namdev Maharaj Pāyari" (step of Sant Namdev Maharaj). The child and future saint, Namdev was an ardent devotee of Vithoba. One day his mother asks him to complete the ritual of "naivedya" (any food made in the house is first offered to God, the ritual comprises placing the offering plate before the deity and sprinkling water around the plate and with a prayer to God). Namdev faithfully does "naivedya" and waits for God to appear and take the offering. But he is disheartened. He keeps praying and requests God to come in person and accept the offering. With no answer, the child starts banging his head at the feet of God. Seeing this utmost devotion and innocence of a child, God appears, eats the offering and blesses Namdev. Namdev asks for being present in the "first step" at His temple, so that innumerable devotees will touch him before having the "darshan" (view). So, this first step is called "Sant Namdev Maharaj Pāyari".

=== Sant Tukaram ===
It is also believed that Tukaram - a 17th-century devotee of Krishna in the form of Vithoba - spent his last days in the temple.

== See also ==
- Rukmini
- Rahi (goddess)
- Avatars of Vishnu
- Chokhamela
