= Narahari Sonar =

13th-century Hindu poet-saint of the Varkari sect

Personal life
- Born: Pandharpur, Solapur, Maharashtra, India)

Religious life
- Religion: Hinduism
- Philosophy: Advaita, Varkari

Narahari Sonar (also spelt Narhari Sonar, literally Narahari the Goldsmith, a name often used in English sources) or Narharidas was a 13th-century Hindu poet-saint of the Varkari sect and goldsmith (sonar) from Maharashtra, India.

== Life ==
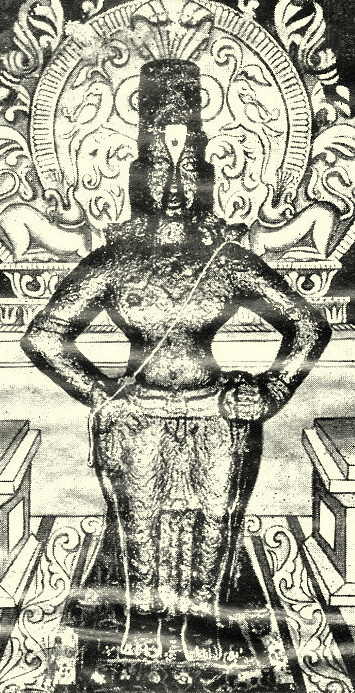
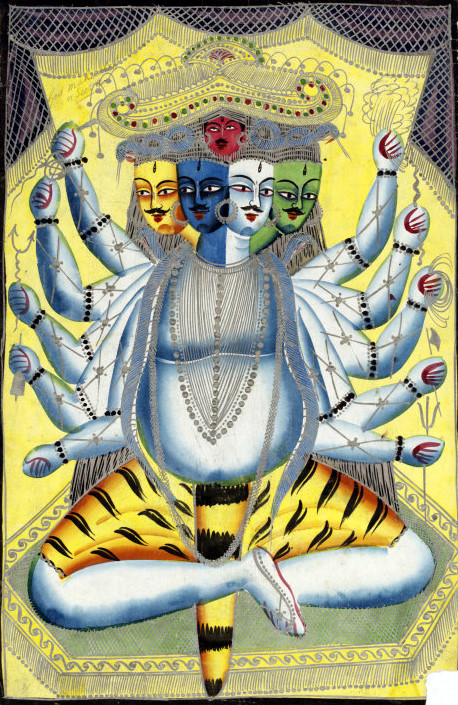
While Narahari Sonar touched the image of Vithoba (left), he felt as though he was touching the image of the five-headed Shiva (right).

Narahari Sonar's chief hagiographical account is found in the Bhaktavijaya by Mahipati (1715 - 1790). Narahari Sonar was a staunch Shaiva (sect which considers the god Shiva as the Supreme Being), who lived in Pandharpur, where the chief temple of Vithoba stands. Vithoba is a form of the god Vishnu and the patron god of the Varkari sect, part of the Vishnu-worshipping Vaishnava sect and a rival sect of the Shaivas. Narahari Sonar worshipped at the Mallikarjuna temple, the Shiva temple located in the southwest part of the town. He is described as "bigoted" and "fanatic". He worshipped only one god, Shiva. He never visited the famous shrine of Vithoba even once and even refused to look at the shikhara (pinnacle) of the temple.

A merchant (in some versions, a rich landlord) had vowed if Vithoba blessed him with a son, he will offer a waistband to the deity. After fulfilment of the vow, the merchant enquired about the best goldsmith in Pandharpur and was led to Narahari Sonar. Narahari agreed to make the waistband on the condition that he will not enter the temple and the merchant bring him the measurements of the stone image of Vithoba. He crafted an ornate waistband with the gold and jewels brought by the merchant and the provided measurements. The merchant offered the waistband to Vithoba, but it was too tight. The merchant returned after Narahari lengthened the waistband, but it was too loose then. The merchant implored Narahari to come to the temple and fit the waistband himself, however Narahari was adamant. He said that he observed the vow of looking only at one deity, Shiva. The merchant suggested that he would blindfold Narahari to maintain the vow. Narahari conceded.

The merchant brought Narahari to the sanctum of Vithoba's temple, while people on the streets mocked Narahari's blindhold and his beliefs. Narahari touched Vithoba's image and felt as though the image had five heads and ten arms. The image wore serpent ornaments around his neck and matted hair on its head. He wore tiger and elephant skin garments and his body was covered in ash. Narahari recognised the iconography of his patron deity Shiva and removed the blindfold to see him. However, he saw the traditional form of Vithoba: a two-armed, arms-akimbo god standing on a brick in silken garments and gold finery. In disbelief, he blindfolded himself again and touched the image. Again, he felt as though he was touching an image of Shiva, not Vithoba. He realised that Shiva and Vithoba (Vishnu) were one and the same. He removes the blindfold and embraces Vithoba's feet. He sings a panegyric in honour of Vithoba, equating him with Vishnu and Shiva alike. Narahari becomes a devotee of Vithoba and joins the Varkaris, preaching the oneness of God.

R. D. Ranade records that Narahari lived in Devagiri (currently known as Daulatabad), before moving to Pandharpur. A staunch Shaiva, he was influenced by the Varkari saint Dnyaneshwar (1275–1296) and others to become the devotee of Vithoba. He died in 1313 (Shaka 1235).

== Teachings in abhangas ==
Narahari Sonar composed Marathi devotional poetry called abhanga. He speaks the ephemeral and unreal world, which like a picture on the wall. Just as children build stone houses and then abandon them, people engage in world affairs and then die. In another abhanga, he speaks about the importance of a guru. Just like an elephant is controlled by an ankusha (goad) and a tiger by a cage, Narahari is brought under control by the grace of his guru Gaibinatha. He talks about an "unstruck sound" has mesmerized his mind. By this sound, he thinks of God and mediates upon Him. Narahari says by his own experience that this sound will fill one with true love of God and lead to Him. Narahari also refers to his profession as a goldsmith in an abhanga. He calls himself a goldsmith who deals in the name of God. Narahari's body is the melting vessel for his soul of gold. "In the matrix of three gunas, he pours the juice of God". He hammers out anger and passion from the soul. With scissors of discernment, he cuts the gold leaf of the name of God. He weighs the name of God with a balance of spiritual enlightenment. Narahari Sonar, the devotee of God, mediates upon Him eternally.

In another abhanga, Narahari Sonar alludes to his profession. He calls God his customer. He says that he "uses his intellect as the scissors to steal the gold of bhakti (devotion) while cutting a deal with his customer - God".

== Remembrance ==
Apart from being formally included in the list of Sants (saints) in the Bhaktavijaya, the abhangas of Eknath accord him sainthood and mention him with other saints. Eknath's abhanga praises Vithoba who melted gold with Narahari.

The Sonar community, to which Narahari belonged, worship him at a shrine they have built in Pandharpur.
