= Dehu =

Dehu Dehugaon
- Town
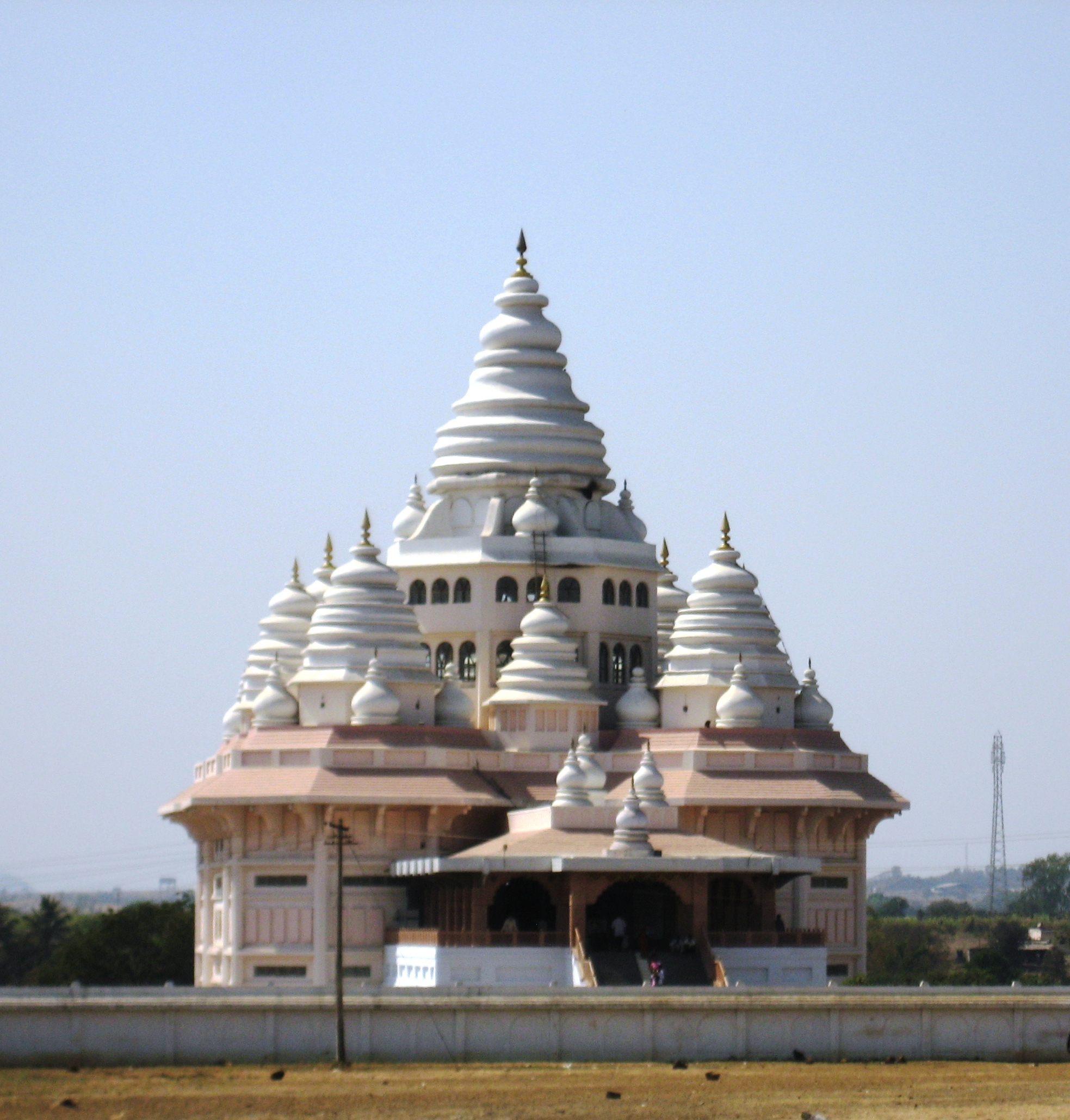
- Gatha Temple

- Location in Maharashtra, India
- Coordinates: 18.72°N 73.77°E
- Country: India
- State: Maharashtra
- District: Pune

Government
  - Type: Urban
  - Body: Nagar Panchayat
- Elevation: 594 m (1,949 ft)

Population (2015)
  - Total: 50,308
- Demonym(s): Punekar, Puneri, Puneite

Languages
  - Official: Marathi
- Time zone: UTC+5:30 (IST)
- Vehicle registration: MH 12, MH 14

Dehu is a town in the Pune district, India. It is known for being the abode of Sant Tukaram.

The Tukaram Palakhi heading towards the town of Pandharpur originates from Dehu in the month of Ashadh.

== Demographics ==
As of 2011 India census, Dehu had a population of 50,308 of which 27,669 are males while 22,638 are females. Dehu has an average literacy rate of 88.64%, higher than the national average of 74.04%: male literacy is 92.79% and, female literacy is 84.22%. In Dehu, 10.76% of the population is under 6 years of age. Kalokhe (Patil), More (Inamdar), Chavan (Patil), Hagavne are famous and old surnames in Dehu.

== Sant Tukaram ==
Sant Tukaram lived in Dehu. His temple is located on the banks of the Indrayani river. This temple was constructed by his younger son Narayanbaba in 1723. A rock (pashan, samadhi) where Saint Tukaram was on fast is also here.

Important Places associated with Tukaram in Dehu are:

- Tukaram Maharaj Janm Sthan Temple, Dehu – place where Tukaramji was born, around which a temple was built later
- Saint Tukaram Vaikunthstan Temple, Dehu – from where Tukaramji ascended to Vaikunth in his mortal form; there is a nice ghat behind this temple along the Indrayani river
- Saint Tukaram Maharaj Gatha Mandir, Dehu – modern structure; massive building housing a big statue of Tukaram; In the Gatha temple, about 4,000 abhangs (verses) created by Tukaram maharaj were carved on the walls.

=== Indrayani River ===
Indrayani river flows through Dehu which later flows through Alandi. The place where Lord Vitthal gave blessings to Saint Tukaram, which is now the main temple in Dehu consisting of the 'Swayambhu' (self-existing) idols of Lord Vitthal and goddess Rakhumai is situated on the banks of river Indrayani. The region of Dehu is known as a 'Sri Kshetra' as it holds the self existing idols of Lord Vishnu and Lakshmi in the form of Vitthal and Rukhmini respectively.
