= Bhavani Peth, Pune =

Bhavani Peth
- Locality in the Pune City
- Location within Maharashtra
- Coordinates: 18.508261°N 73.868358°E
- Country: India
- State: Maharashtra
- City: Pune

Bhavani Peth is an area located in Pune City, in Maharashtra State of the Republic of India. A study in 1990 described Bhavani Peth as the largest slum settlement in Pune.

The name of the area is derived from the Goddess Bhavani . The main attraction of Bhavani Peth is the Shri Bhavani Mata Mandir. Served by (Proprietor -Medhekar)family .In early days it was located in outskirts of Punawadi. Another major tourist attraction is the Vithoba Temple, officially known as Shri Vitthal-Rukmini Mandir Marathi. Historically, Bhavani Peth was one of the traditional handloom centers of Pune.

Bhavani Peth is located in the heart of the city and is an ancient locality of Pune. The area dates back to before the establishment of the British Raj in India.

The term 'Peth' is used to describe any old locality in Pune, however the term is derived from the ancient Indian tradition of increased business on a certain day of the week, similarly to the American Black Friday but every Friday.

Present-day Bhavani Peth serves as the center of local timber trade. It is also home to a thriving steel and hardware market catering to those operating in the civil and allied industries.

Bhavani Peth is easily accessible from anywhere in Pune. Many buses start their journey to Bhavani Peth from the Shivaji Nagar bus terminus.
