= Pandharpur =

Town in Maharashtra, India

- City
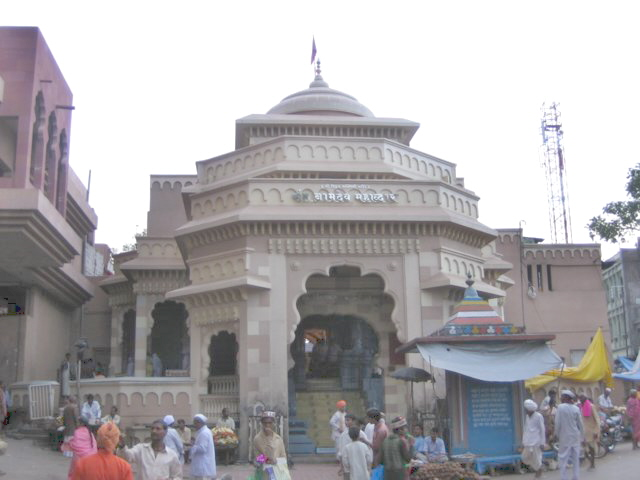
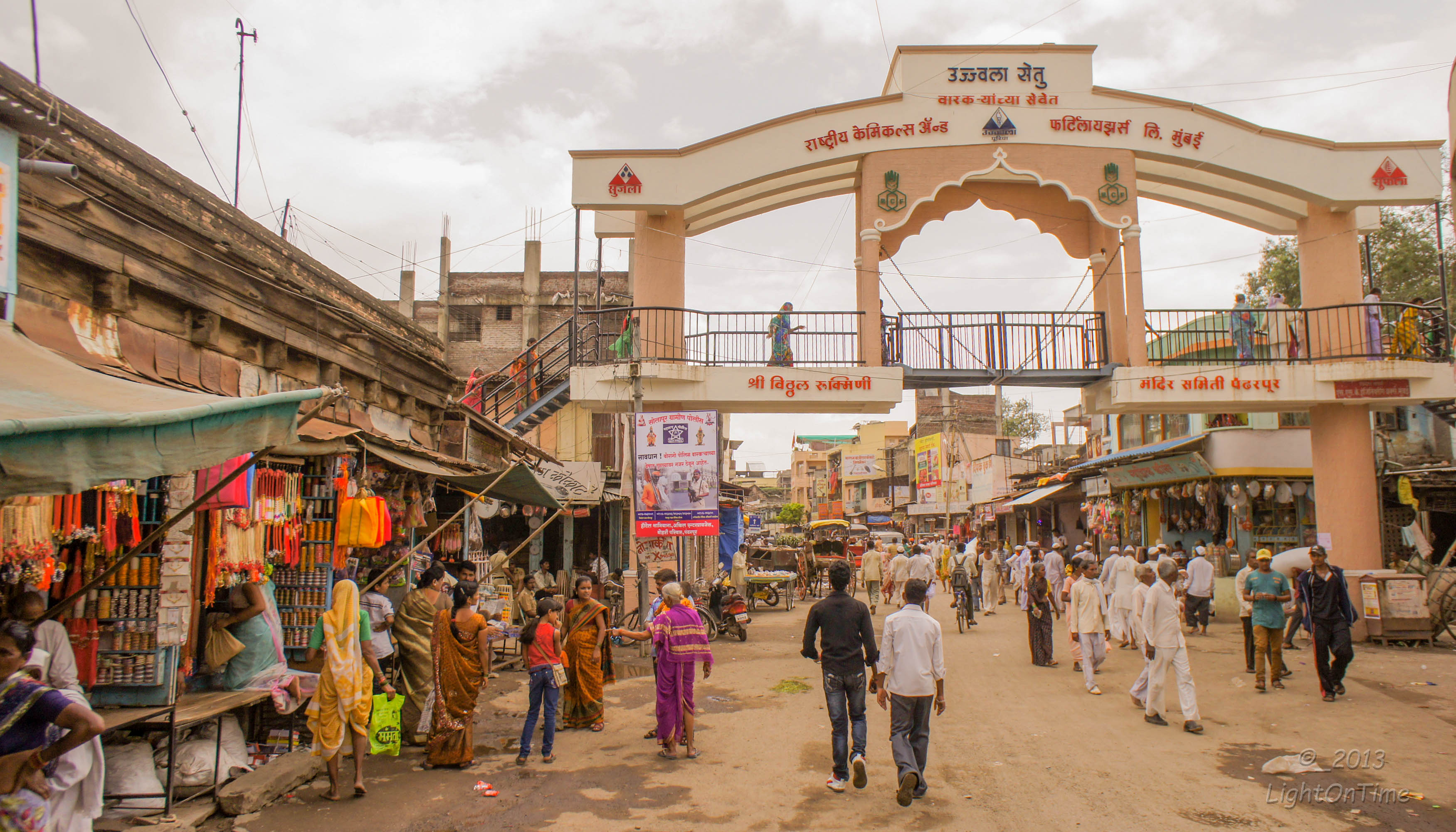
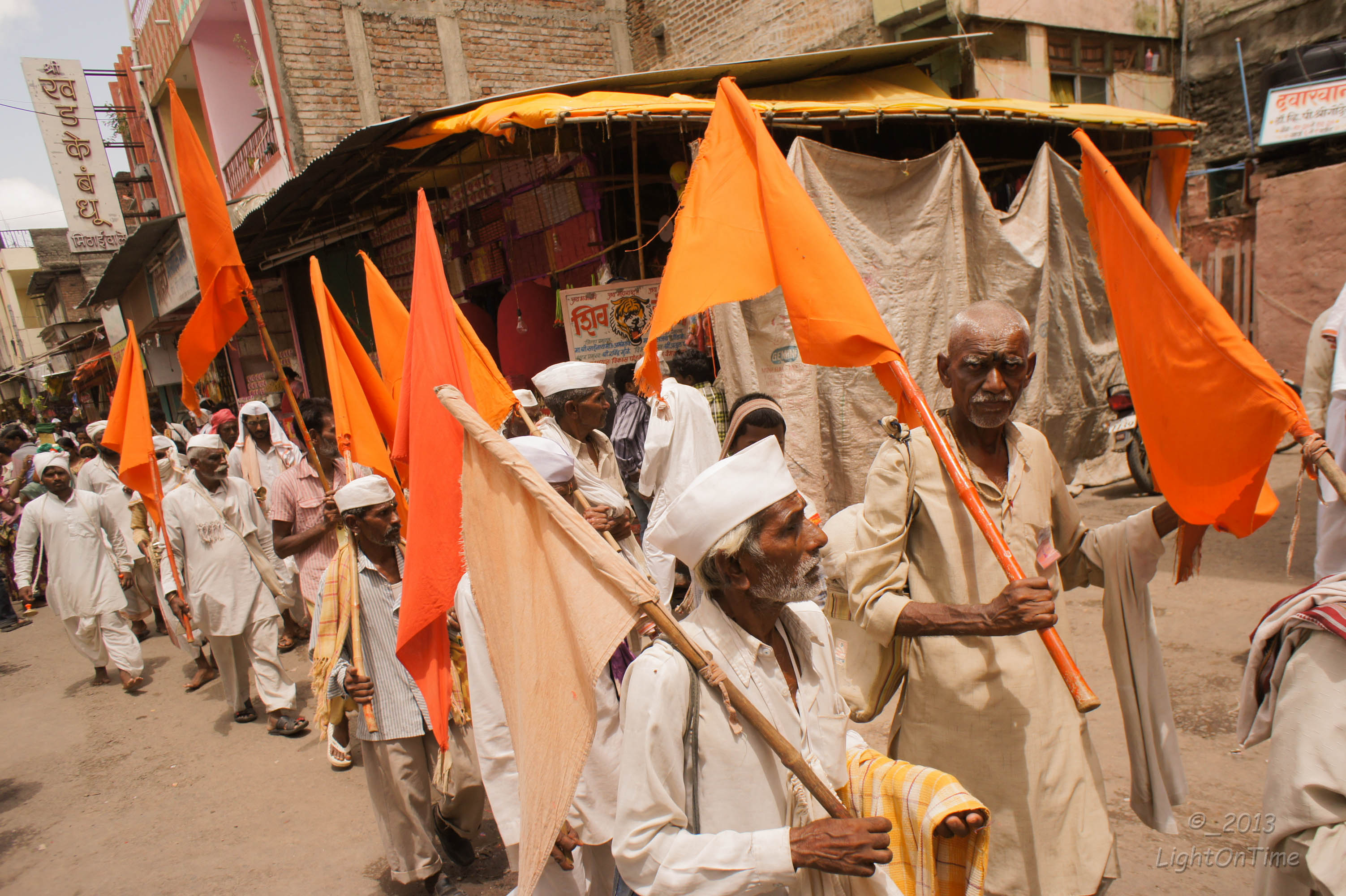
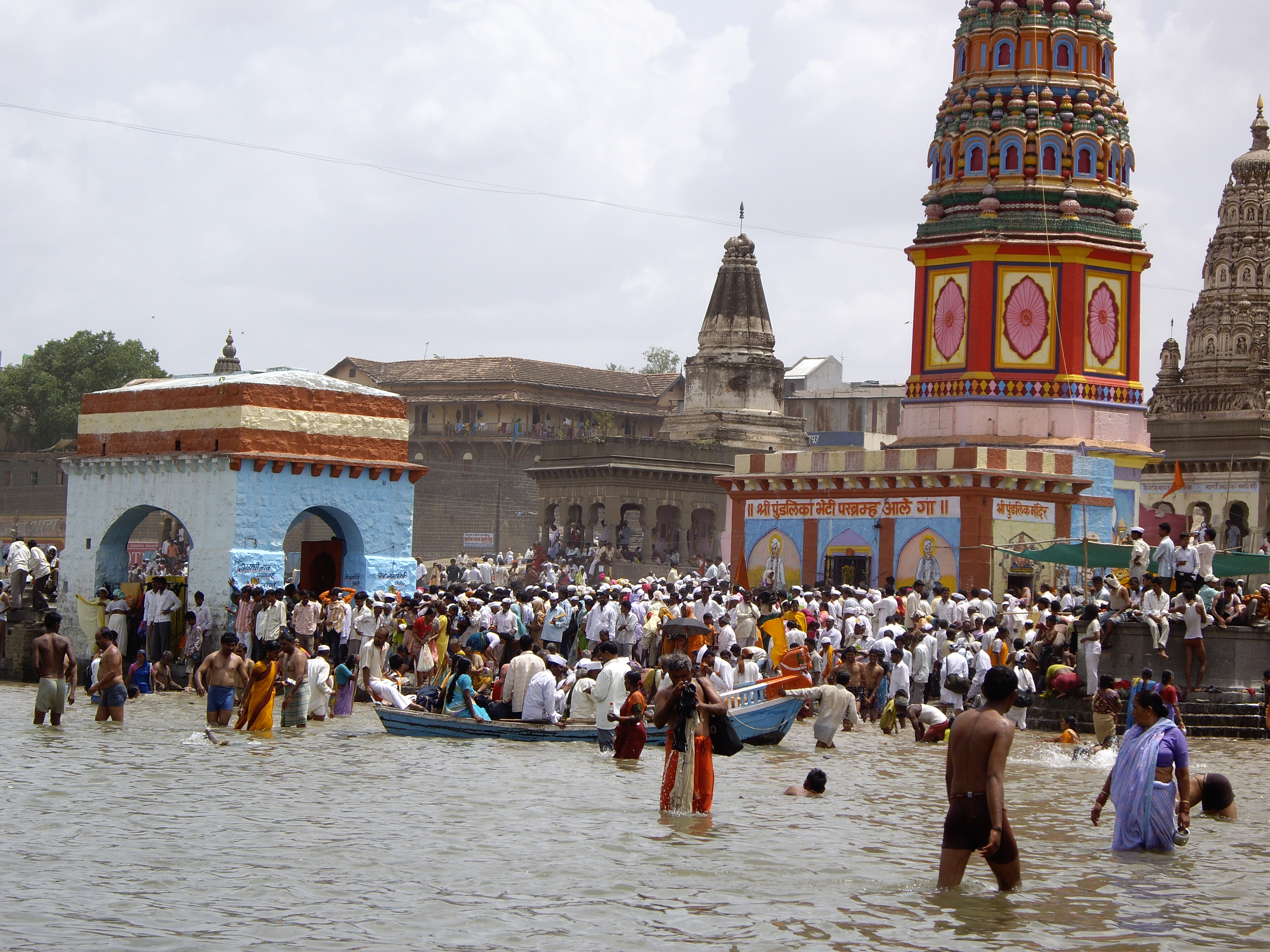
- The chief gate of Vitthal's temple, facing the Bhima River, Ujwala Setu, Pandharpur Wari, Chandrabhaga river
- Nicknames: Pandhari, Pandaripuram
- Location in Maharashtra, India
- Coordinates: 17°40′40″N 75°19′40″E
- Country: India
- State: Maharashtra
- District: Solapur

Government
  - Type: Municipal Council

Area
  - Total: 20.2 km^{2} (7.8 sq mi)
  - Rank: 9
- Elevation: 450 m (1,480 ft)

Population (2015)
  - Total: 242,515
  - Density: 12,000/km^{2} (31,100/sq mi)

Language
  - Official: Marathi
- Time zone: UTC+5:30 (IST)
- Postal code: 413304
- Vehicle registration: MH-13

Pandharpur (Marathi: [pəɳɖʱəɾpuːɾ]), also Pandaripuram, is a popular pilgrimage city, on the banks of Chandrabhagā River, near Solapur city in Solapur District, Maharashtra, India. Its administrative area is one of eleven tehsils in the District, and it is an electoral constituency of the state legislative assembly (vidhan sabha). The Vithoba temple attracts about a million Hindu pilgrims during the major yātrā (pilgrimage) in Ashadha (June–July). Kasegaon is the largest village in pandharpur talukas.A small temple of Śri Vitthala-Rukmini is also located, which is as old as the main Vitthala-Rukmini Mandir, in Isbavi area of Pandharpur known as Wakhari Va Korti Devalayas and also known as Visava Mandir. The Bhakti Saint, Chaitanya Mahaprabhu, is said to have spent 7 days in the city at the Vithobha Temple. It is said that the deity Vithoba has been worshipped by many saints of Maharashtra. Sant Dnyaneshwar, Sant Tukārām, Sant Nāmdev, Sant Eknāth, Sant Nivruttināth, Sant Muktābai, Sant Chokhāmel̥ā, Sant Savatā Māli, Sant Narhari Sonār, Sant Gorā Kumbhār, Sant Meerā Bai and Sant Gajānan Mahāraj are a few of those prominent saints.

== Name ==
The first undisputed mention of Pandharpur (Paṇḍharpūr) is a December 1237 inscription that refers to the village of Paṇḍarage, on the bank of the Bhīmarathī river. This name is derived from the Kannada word paṇḍara, meaning "pandal", with the Kannada possessive suffix -ge. Pandharpur was also historically known as Pāṇḍuraṅgapura, first attested in an inscription dated to June 1270 describing a sacrifice taking place in "the splendid city of Pāṇḍuraṅgapura". The name Pāṇḍuraṅgapura comes from Pāṇḍuraṅga, an alternate name for the god Viṭhobā, or Viṭṭhala, who has been closely associated with Pandharpur since at least the 13th century. Shobhana Gokhale has suggested that the name Pāṇḍuraṅga may itself be a Sanskritised form of the Kannada name Paṇḍarage.

An inscription dated to the year 516 that mentions a village called Pāṇḍaraṅgapalli had also been identified with Pandharpur, but this was disputed by Vasudev Vishnu Mirashi, who according to archaeologists M. S. Mate and M. K. Dhavalikar, had "proved conclusively" that Pāṇḍaraṅgapalli did not refer to Pandharpur.

== History ==
Small-scale archaeological excavation by Mate and Dhavalikar in 1968 found no evidence of occupation at the site before the 1200s, during the Yadava period. (Note: These excavations were done at a vacant lot just north of the Vithoba temple, in the middle of town and at one of the highest points in town, which "might represent the highest accumulation of debris".) Evidence from this earliest phase of settlement consisted of one or two structures (Note: Mate and Dhavalikar wrote that Structure 2 was, "in all probability, a rejuvenation of Structure 1 on a more regular plan, keeping the hearth in the original position but raising the level of the floor by 0 to 12 cm".) with a double hearth, along with various pottery fragments. Slightly older than this, though, is an inscription in the Vithoba temple dated to the year 1189, which states that a small shrine to Vithoba was set up that year for the first time. Thus, according to Shima Iwao, the origins of Vithoba worship at Pandharpur cannot be much older than this period. (Note: The Padma Purāṇa does include a reference to "the god Viṭṭhala on the river Bhīmarathī", but according to Gokhale, this may be a later interpolation and thus "cannot be taken as authentic evidence" for establishing an earlier date for Viṭṭhala. The Padma Purāṇa also makes no reference to the town Pandharpur itself.)

The earliest undisputed epigraphic mentions of Pandharpur itself date from the 1200s as well: the 1237 inscription referring to the village of Paṇḍarage, which describes the construction of a temple gateway by the reigning monarch, and the 1270 inscription referring to the city of Pāṇḍuraṅgapura, which refers to a sacrifice taking place here. Further inscriptions dated to 1273-77 record the construction of a temple to Vithoba on the site of the earlier shrine — that is, on the site of the present temple.

From this point on, references to Pandharpur in literary and administrative documents become commonplace.

In the era of Adilshahi, most of the city was destroyed by Afzal Khan. Saints from all across Maharashtra still gathered here for annual pilgrimage and thus Pandharpur became the heart of the devotional movement which laid to the social-religious reform. This resulted in new social synthesis which later paved the foundation of Maratha Empire.

Śrīdhar Nāzarekar, described in the late 1800s as "the most universally beloved of all Marathi poets", lived in Pandharpur, and he wrote most of his major works here between approximately 1690 and 1720; he later died here in 1729. Among his works was the Pāṇḍuranga-Māhātmya, which largely consists of "an annotated list of all the holy places of Pandharpur, giving the stories associated with them and an account of the merits to be acquired by visiting them". However, very few of the places listed by Śrīdhar as part of the early-1700s version of the Pandharpur Vari are identifiable today.

In the second half of the 18th century under the Marathas the temple and city was rebuilt under the Peshwas of Pune, Scindia of Gwalior and Holkar of Indore.

== Geography ==
Pandharpur is located on the western bank of the Bhima river, which is locally known as the Chandrabhaga. This area is one of the driest parts of Maharashtra, averaging about 250 to 300 mm of rain each year, and large trees are sparse except along the riverbank. This area is more prone to drought and bad harvests than most of the rest of the state.

== Mahadwar ==
Mahadwar is main locality in the city and a market place. Mahadwar leads to main ghāt of Pandharpur that is "Mahadwar ghat". There is temple of Bhakta Pundalik on the ghāt.

It is said that Krishna came to Pandharpur to meet his disciple Bhakta Pundalīka who was busy serving his parents at that time he offered brick called viṭ in maraṭhi to Krishna and requested him to wait standing on the brick for some time till he attended to his parents. The same Krishna is standing on the brick for the last 28 yuga and thus is also known as Vitthala. So in ārati of vitthal it is mentioned "yuge atṭhāvis (28), viṭhevari ubhā".

== Religious significance ==
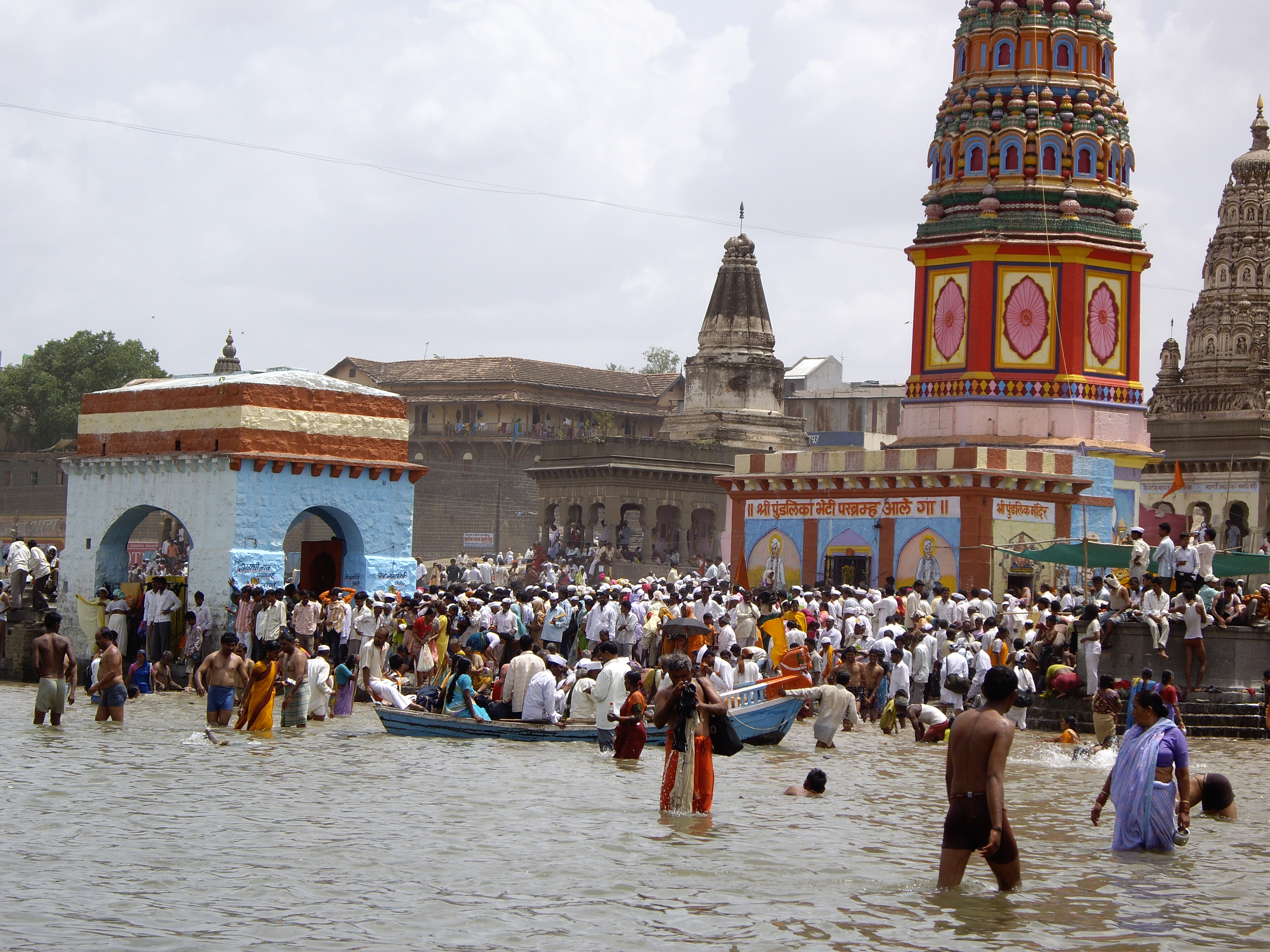
Pilgrims bathing in the Chandrabhaga river at Pandharpur

Pandharpur is described by Raeside as "probably the greatest centre of pilgrimage in Maharashtra", and by Mate and Dhavalikar as having "practically unsurpassed importance in the social, cultural, and religious life of the Marathi people".. The key to Pandharpur's religious importance is the temple of Viṭhobā, or Viṭṭhala, which is the centrepiece of the Vārkarī religious tradition that worships Viṭhobā. Pilgrimage to Pandharpur, the Paṇḍharpūr Vārī, is the most important religious activity for Vārkarīs. The Vārī takes place twice per year, in the months of Āṣāḍha (which is between June and July in the Gregorian calendar) and Kārtika (October and November), and it is scheduled so that pilgrims reach Pandharpur on Ekādaśī (the 11th day of the waxing moon) of each month.

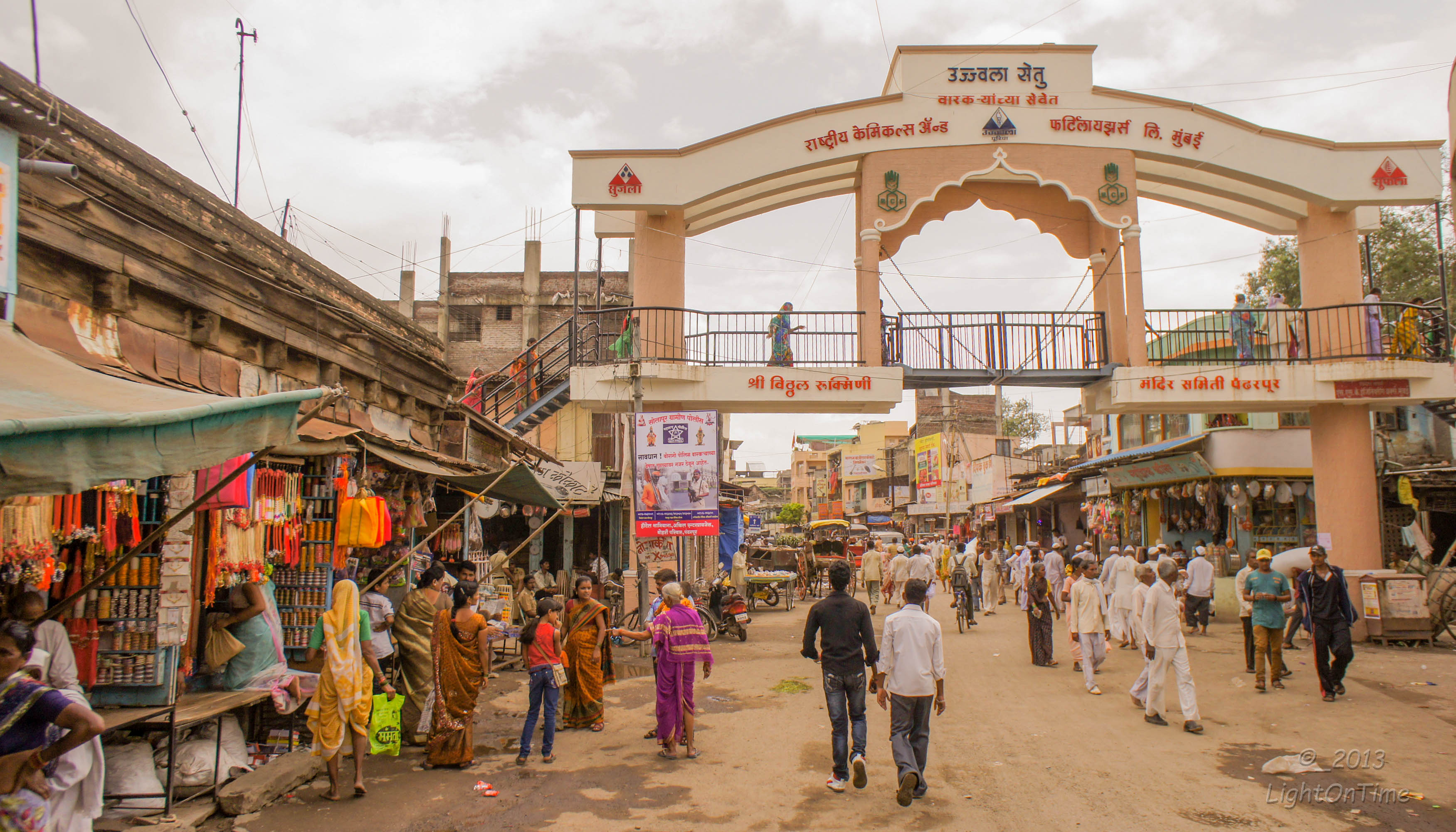
Pandharpur streets

Upon reaching Pandharpur, pilgrims first bathe themselves in the Bhima river, visit the various shrines and temples along the riverbank. These shrines and temples are said to mark the spot where past sages "entered samādhi" (died peacefully). The most popular of these shrines is that of Puṇḍalīka, who is credited with introducing Viṭhobā worship to Pandharpur. Next, pilgrims perform a parikramā (clockwise circumambulation) along the road that goes around the temple (known as the Pradakṣiṇā road). They then worship at the Mallikārjuna temple before proceeding to the temple of Viṭhobā.

At the front gate of the Viṭhobā temple is a small samādhi shrine honouring Chokhāmeḷā, and just inside the gate is a bust of Nāmadeva. Visitors pay their respects to these two Hindu sants, and then go up the stairs into the temple. Inside, visitors worship Viṭhobā along with various other deities, who are mostly but not exclusively affiliated with Vishnu. Finally, after leaving the temple, they come to a small shrine of Gopālakṛṣṇa, which marks the end of the pilgrimage.

=== Temple of Vithoba, or Vitthala ===
Map of the Vithoba temple and its surroundings

The temple of Viṭhobā, or Viṭṭhala, is divided into six main areas. The first area is the smaller Mukti Mandapa, followed by the larger Sabhā Mandapa (assembly hall), which contains images of Dattātreya, Garuḍa, and Hanumān. Beyond the Sabhā Mandapa and up some stairs is the Solākhāṃbi, a medium-sized hall with 16 pillars, followed by the Caukhāṃbi, a smaller hall with 4 pillars. At the back of the Caukhāmbi is a small chamber, at "the deepest recess and highest location of the temple", where the mūrti of Viṭhobā himself is enshrined. Visitors bow before the image of the god and receive the priests' blessings before proceeding to a couple of small rooms off to the side where they worship Rukmiṇī, Mahālakṣmī, and Veṅkaṭeśvara. Finally, devotees go into other small rooms to worship several other deities, "as deemed appropriate": Ambā, a local tutelary goddess; Rāmeśvara Śiva, a linga supposedly placed by Rāma; Rāma himself, along with his brother Lakṣmaṇa; Sūrya, the sun god; Rādhā; Satyabhāmā; a snake god named Nāgobā; Narasiṃha, the man-lion avatar of Vishnu; Kālabhairava, a fierce form of Shiva; and several others.

==== Temple management ====
The temple is administered by a committee of Deshastha Brahmins, known as baḍavā, who are in charge of all financial assets of the temple and who oversee the various rituals and events held here. They are not the ones who actually perform the rituals, though; that is done by various other priests.

==== Annual observances ====
The biggest events are the pilgrimages in Āṣāḍha and Kārtika, on the 11th through 15th of each month. Ordinarily, visitors are only allowed to view the image of Viṭhobā during daylight hours, but during pilgrimage season, they are allowed to do so at any time of day or night. On the day of Raṅgapañcamī, after Holi, people sprinkle red powder on the feet of the mūrti. Finally, in observance of Gokulāṣṭamī, or Kṛṣṇāṣṭamī, people celebrate by singing and dancing in front of Viṭhobā's image for nine days.

=== Mallikarjuna temple ===
The Mallikārjuna temple, which enshrines a Shiva linga, is said to be the oldest temple in Pandharpur. It was later incorporated into the main Viṭhobā parikramā, resulting in it being the only site on the parikramā that is devoted to Shiva.

== Demographics ==
According to the 2011 census of India, Pandharpur had a population of 98,000. Males constituted 52% of the population and females, 48%. 71% of the population was literate; 78% of males and 64% of females.

Marathi is the official and main language of the people.

It is a major holy place in Maharashtra and it is also called South Kashi (Dakshin Kashi) in Maharashtra. It is famous for the Lord Vitthala temple situated on the bank of the Bhima river. Bhima river is also known as Chandrabhaga as it takes shape like a crescent moon near the city and hence gets the name. There are 4 yatra's (vaari- gathering of pilgrims/devotees) per year, Chaitri, Ashadhi, Kartiki and Maghi, of which Ashadhi and Kartiki are the main ones. Devotees come from all over Maharashtra, Karnataka and some part of Tamil Nadu

== Connectivity ==
=== By road ===
Pandharpur is 76 km from Solapur, 136 km from Sangli, 210 km from Pune and 360 km from Mumbai. MSRTC bus station is located in the central part of city and at just 1 km distance from Shri Vitthala-Rukmini Temple. Direct services to almost all parts of Maharashtra are available with the highest frequency to the cities of Solapur, Sangli and Pune. When it comes to other states, daily buses are available to different parts of Karnataka(mostly north Karnataka) and Hyderabad. Apart from this many private bus services operate daily between Pandharpur to Pune and Pandharpur to Sangli.

=== By train ===
Pandharpur railway station has daily trains to Kurduwadi and Miraj junctions. Kolhapur-Nagpur Express is available twice a week on Monday and Friday. Daily direct train from Sangli railway station to Pandharpur is also available daily night which is Sangli-Miraj-Parli Vaijnath express. Every Friday there is a train to Yeshwantpur (Bengaluru), Daily there is a train to Mysore Via: Vijayapura, Gadag, Hubballi and Bengaluru. Dadar-Satara express running on Dadar-Pandharpur-Sangli-Satara also connects Pandharpur to Sangli, Bhilavdi, Kirloskarvadi, Karad, Masur, Satara.

=== By air ===
Nearest International and domestic airports are Pune Airport (210 km) and Kolhapur airport (180 km).

== Tourism ==
Pandharpur is notable for its tourist destination of Shri Vitthal-Rukmini Mandir.
