= Aundh =

Aundh may refer to

- Aundh State, a princely state in British India
  - Aundh Experiment, an early test of village-level self-government in British India
- Aundh, Satara, Satara District, Maharashtra, India
- Aundh, Pune, suburb of Pune, Maharashtra, India
