= Pant Pratinidhi family =

Aristocratic noble family of India

- Current region: Pune, India
- Etymology: The Viceroy
- Origin: Kinhai, Satara, Satara District, Maharashtra, India
- Members: Parshuram Trimbak Pant Pratinidhi; Krishnarao Pant Pratinidhi; Shripatrao Pant Pratinidhi; Jagjivanrao Pant Pratinidhi; Bhawanrao Shriniwasrao Pant Pratinidhi; Parashuram Rao Pant Pratinidhi; Parashuramrao Shrinivas I
- Connected families: Gandekar family
- Estates: Aundh State; Vishalgad estate

Pant Pratinidhi family is a prominent aristocratic noble family of India, who served as Pratinidhis to Chhatrapatis of Maratha Empire and later became rulers of the Princely states of Aundh and Vishalgad.

The Pant Pratinidhi's were officers of the highest dignity under the Maratha Empire. They were ranked above all Ashta Pradhans and even above Peshwas during Rajaram I to Shahu I times.

== History ==
The family of the Pant Pratinidhi is descended from Trimbak Krishna, the Kulkarni (village officer) of Kinhai. Parshuram Trimbak Pant Pratinidhi, son of Trimbak Krishna was the founder of the family. Parshuram Pant Pratinidhi was born in 1660 in kinhai village. The family name of Pant Pratinidhi family is Jaykar.

== Family tree ==
=== First generation ===
- Parshuram Pant Pratinidhi (1660-1718), was the first of a series of hereditary Pratinidhis (Marathi for Viceroy) hailing from the Marathi Deshastha Brahmin family. Parshuram Pant entered the service of Rajaram I and distinguished himself in the field; within a few years he was appointed as Sardar in 1690. Pant was appointed as Pratinidhi by Rajaram I in 1698 for his excellence.

=== Second generation ===
Parshuram Trimbak married, had five sons and two daughters.

- Krishnarao Parashuram, was the elder son of Parshuram Trimbak and first chief of Vishalgad. In 1713, Shahu I awarded the jagir (feudal estate) of Vishalgad to Parashuram Trimbak. Parashuram Trimbak sent his eldest son, Krishnarao, to assume the management of the fort and the jagir of Vishalgarh. However, he no sooner obtained possession than he revolted and tendered his services to Sambhaji II, cousin and rival of Shahu I. Krishnarao was appointed Pratinidhi by Sambhaji II, the Raja of Kolhapur. Among his brothers, Krishnarao was the only one to be blessed with surviving sons. His eldest son, Gangadhar Rao, was in turn the father of two sons, one of whom succeeded as the ruler of Aundh and the other as the jagirdar of Vishalgarh.
- Trimbak Pant, who died young.
- Shrinivasrao Parshuram, also known as Shripatrao Pant Pratinidhi (1687- 25 November 1746), was the Pratinidhi to Shahu I and the second Chief of Aundh. He led many battles as a general in the defense of the Maratha Empire. In 1718, he was appointed Pant Pratinidhi of Maratha Empire. Shripatrao is famous for his campaigns of Khatav and his Karnataka Expeditions. Having no surviving sons, he was succeeded by his younger brother.
- Jagjivan Parshuram (1691-1754), also known as Dadobha, was the fourth son of Parshuram Trimbak. He succeeded his brother Shripatrao Pant Pratinidhi as the third Chief of Aundh upon the latter's death in 1746. Like his brother, he did not have surviving sons, and therefore adopted (and was succeeded by) his grand-nephew, the elder son of Gangadhar Rao (see below).
- Sadashivrao Pant, who died young.
- Godu Bai, who was married into Gugardhare family.
- Yesu Bai, who was married into Kolekar Deshpande family.

=== Third generation ===
Shrimant Krishnaji Parshuram married and had four sons.

- Shrimant Gangadharrao Pant
- Shrimant Amrutrao Krishnaji Pant Pratinidhi was the son of Krishnaji Parshuram and the second Chief of Vishalgad.
- Shrimant Trimbakrao Krishnaji Pant
- Shrimant Shivram Krishnaji Pant

=== Fourth generation ===
- Shrimant Shrinivasrao Gangadhar was the son of Gangadharrao Pant and the fourth Chief of Aundh State.
- Shrimant Krishnaji Amrutrao Pant Pratinidhi was the son of Amrutrao Krishnaji and the third chief of Vishalgad.

== Bibliography ==
- Pant, Apa (1989). An Unusual Raja: Mahatma Gandhi and the Aundh Experiment. Sangam Books. ISBN 9780861317523.
- Bond, J.W (2006). Indian States: A Biographical, Historical, and Administrative Survey. Asian Educational Services. ISBN 9788120619654.
- Pant, Apa (1990). An Extended Family Or Fellow Pilgrims. Sangam Books. ISBN 9780863111099.
