= Bhawanrao Shriniwasrao Pant Pratinidhi =

Maharaja of Aundh from 1909 to 1947

Bhawanrao Shriniwasrao Pant Pratinidhi CBE
- Meherban Shrimant Raja
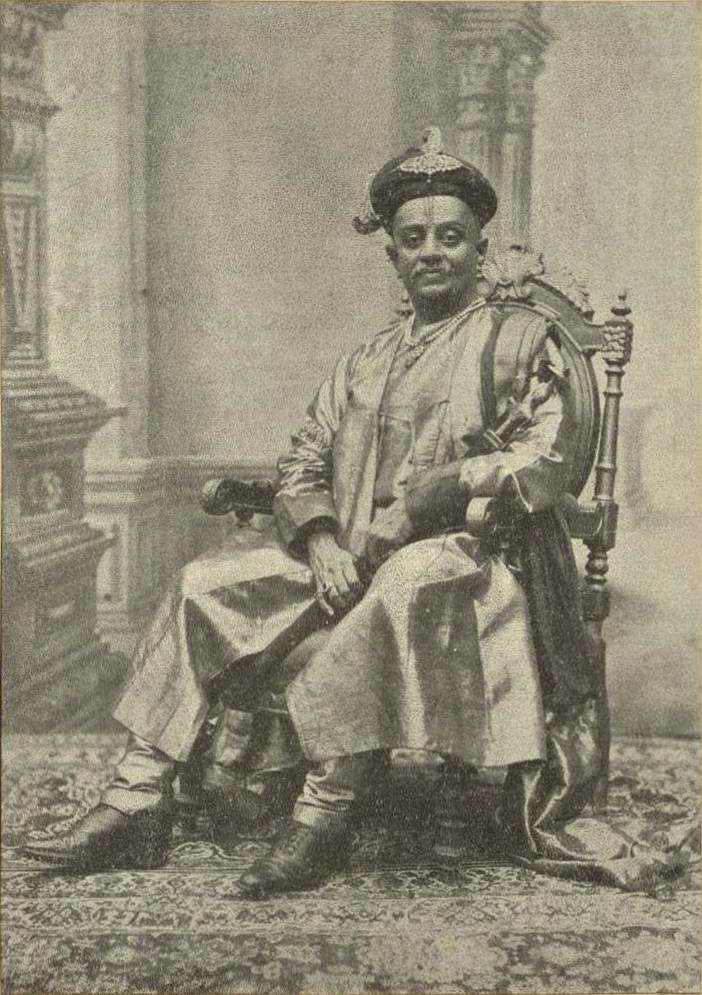
- Bhawanrao Shriniwasrao in 1911

9th Raja of Aundh State
- Reign: 1909–1947
- Predecessor: Gopalkrishnarao Parashuram "Nana Sahib"
- Successor: Bhagwantrao Pant Pratinidhi "Bapu Sahib"
- Born: 24 October 1868
- Died: 13 April 1951 (aged 82)
- Issue: Shrimant Trimbakrao Pant (Raje Sahib); Parshuram Rao Pant (Appa Saheb); Madhav Rao Pant (Bapu Sahib); Krishna Rao Pant (Aaba Sahib); Gangadhar Rao Pant (Tatya Sahib); Gopal Rao Pant (Bala Sahib)
- Religion: Hinduism

Bhawanrao Shriniwasrao Pant Pratinidhi, CBE (24 October 1868 – 13 April 1951), popularly known as Balasaheb Pant Pratinidhi, or Bhawanrao Balasaheb Pant Pratinidhi, was the ruler of the princely state of Aundh during the British Raj, from 1909 until 1947.

He was an advocate of physical culture and is known for inventing the exercise sequence of Surya Namaskar, known in the West as the "sun salutation", now incorporated into modern yoga as exercise.

== Life ==
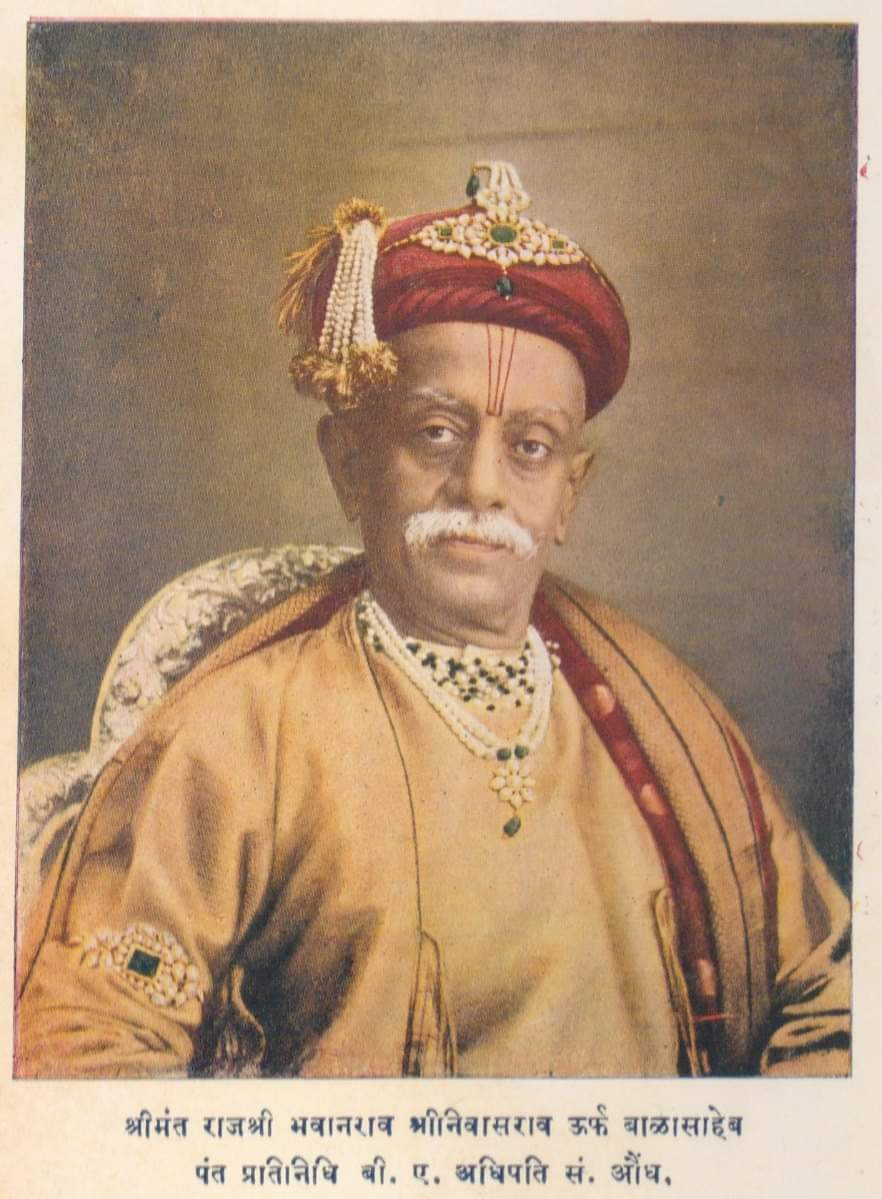
Portrait of Bhawanrao Shriniwasrao, 1922

Bhawanrao Shriniwasrao was born to Shriniwasrao Parashuram "Anna Sahib" (7th Raja of Aundh) on 24 October 1868 in a Deshastha Brahmin family. He studied at Satara High School and completed his Bachelor of Arts in Deccan College of University of Bombay in Pune. He ascended the throne as the Raja of Aundh State on 4 November 1909, after the British deposed the previous ruler over a plot to assassinate an advisor sent by them and considered Bhwanrao to be the most suitable successor owing to his educational qualifications. Although Balasaheb was not a scholar, he was avid reader and his Sanskrit was good. He worked as Chief Secretary to his father from 1895 to 1901 in order to learn the Administration of the State.

He died on 13 April 1951, at the St. George Hospital in Bombay..

== Aundh Experiment ==
The Aundh Experiment was an early test of village-level self-government initiated by Balasaheb. Unusual at that time, he relinquished most of his powers as a ruler of a princely state to his populace in 1938 on his seventieth birthday. This declaration was followed up by the adoption of a Swaraj (self-rule) Constitution in January 1939, formulated in consultation with Mahatma Gandhi and Maurice Frydman. For Gandhi, Aundh’s small, rural base suggested the possibilities of testing his cherished idea of gram-rajya or village republics; broadly, this idea entailed treating the village as an autonomous and self-sufficient administrative and economic unit.

== Family ==
His second son Appa Sahib Pant (1912–1992) served as Indian ambassador in many countries. Appa was honored by Government of India in 1954, with the award of Padma Shri, the fourth highest Indian civilian award for his contributions to the society, placing him among the first recipients of the award.

== Patron of arts, literature, and physical culture ==
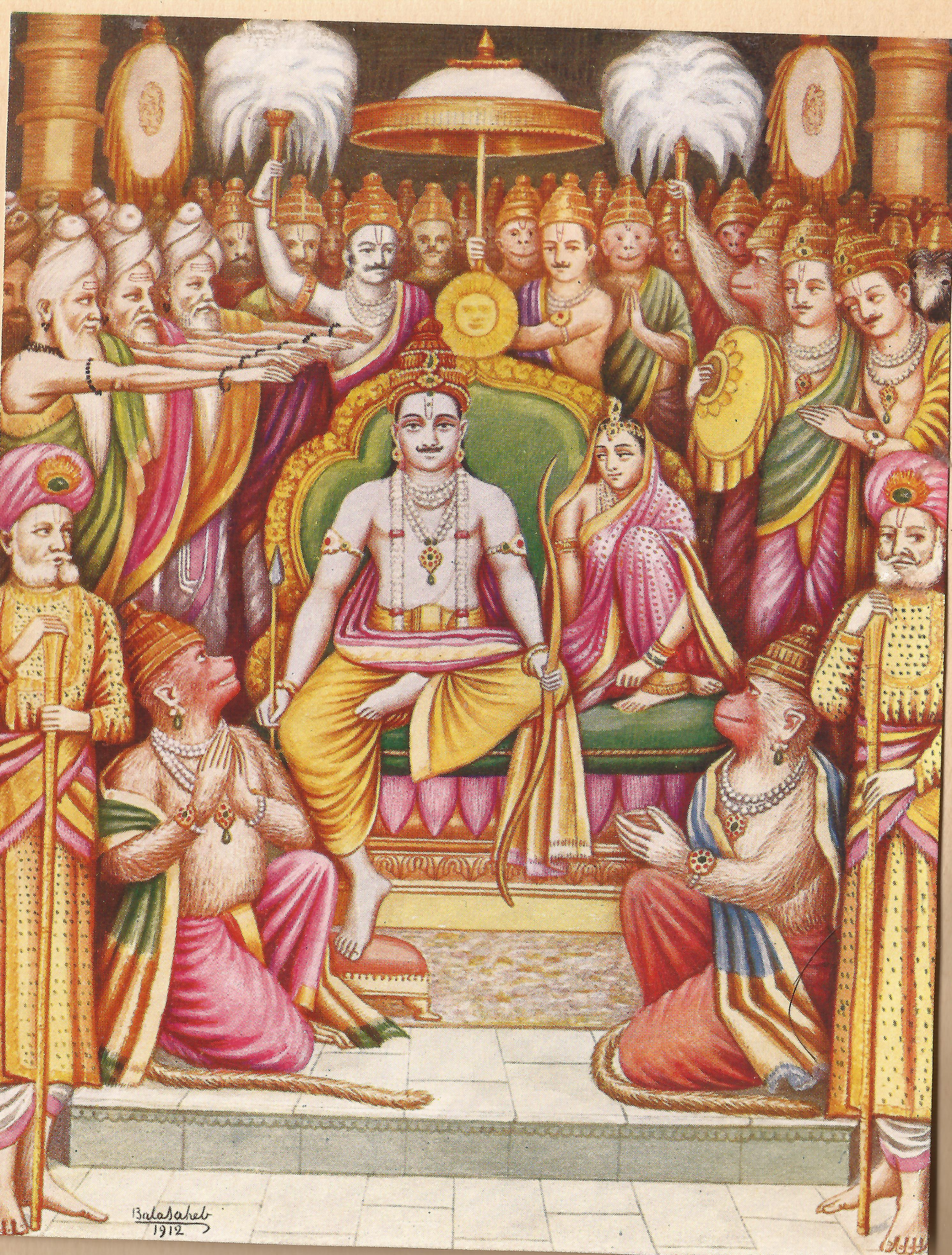
Bhawanrao, in addition to publishing Chitra Ramayana, also illustrated the pictures in the book. This image is of the coronation of Rama.

Bhawanrao was a man of letters, an accomplished painter, and an erudite musical kirtankar. He was a patron for many artists including the polymath Shripad Damodar Satwalekar. In addition, he provided patronage to many other artists from the Jamsetjee Jeejeebhoy School of Art. He presided over Marathi Sahitya Sammelan held in Indore in 1935. He also served as President of the Poona Sarvajanik Sabha.

=== Shri Bhavani Museum ===
Bhawanrao was an avid collector, patron and commissioner of arts. He set up a museum on the Yamai temple hill in Aundh to hold his art collection. The museum has the distinction of being one of the first art museums in India to be set up by an Indian as an art museum rather than as a museum of archeological artifacts.

The museum collection includes paintings and sculptures of various well-known artists including Raja Ravi Varma and the famous "Mother and Child" stone structure by Henry Moore. It also has various works of art by former alumni of the Sir J. J. School of Art such as M. V. Dhurandhar, and Madhav Satwalekar. The museum includes a collection of paintings by Dhurandhar on the life of the founder of Maratha empire Shivaji which was commissioned by Balasaheb in 1926. The museum also holds works from the Bengal school. The collection includes casts and copies of many popular western classical sculptures and paintings. There is a small collection of Indian paintings from the pre-modern period especially of the Kangra or Pahadi style.

=== Physical culture ===
Balasaheb was avid bodybuilder and promoter of physical culture, and a devotee of the teaching of the European muscle-man Eugen Sandow (1867–1925). In the 1920s, he popularised the flowing sequences of salute to the sun, Surya Namaskar, containing popular asanas such as Uttanasana and upward and downward dog poses, helping to shape yoga as exercise. He published Surya Namaskars in 1928, a step-by-step guide to yoga exercises. In 1938, British author Louise Morgan edited and updated Pant's book as the Ten Point Way to Health: Surya Namaskars which introduced Indian physical culture exercises to European women.

=== Literary contributions ===
- The Chitra Ramayana or Picture Ramayana (1916) - Balasaheb published and illustrated the book.
- The Ten-Point Way To Health: Surya Namaskars (1928)
- Surya namaskaramulu (1928) Telugu translation.
- Ajanta (1932)
- Surya Namaskar (1939) Gujarati translation.
- Surya Namaskars (1940)
- Surya Namaskar (1973) Hindi translation.

== See also ==
- Pant Pratinidhi family
- Aundh State
- Aundh Experiment

== Sources ==
- Goldberg, Elliott (2016). The Path of Modern Yoga: The History of an Embodied Spiritual Practice. Inner Traditions. ISBN 978-1-62055-567-5. OCLC 926062252.
- Mehta, Silva; Mehta, Mira; Mehta, Shyam (1990). Yoga: The Iyengar Way. Dorling Kindersley. ISBN 978-0863184208.
- Pant, Apa (1989). An Unusual Raja: Mahatma Gandhi and the Aundh Experiment. Sangam Books. ISBN 9780861317523.
- Pant, Pratinidhi; Morgan, Louise (1938) [1929]. The Ten-Point Way to Health = Surya Namaskars... Edited with an introduction by Louise Morgan. J. M. Dent.

Bhawanrao Shriniwasrao Pant Pratinidhi Royal family of Aundh Born: c. 24 October 1868 Died: 13 April 1951
Regnal titles
Preceded by Gopalkrishnarao Parashuram "Nana Sahib"	Raja of the Aundh State; 1909 – 1947	Succeeded by Shrimant Bhagwant Rao Trimbak "Bapu Sahib"
