= Maurice Frydman =

Indian activist (1901–1976)

- Born: Maurycy Frydman-Mor; 20 October 1901; Warsaw, Russian Empire
- Died: 9 March 1976 (aged 74); Bombay, India
- Other names: Swami Bharatananda
- Occupations: Engineer; Humanitarian
- Known for: The Aundh Experiment

Maurice Frydman (Maurycy Frydman or Maurycy Frydman-Mor in Polish), aka Swami Bharatananda (20 October 1901 in Warsaw, Russian Empire – 9 March 1976 in Bombay, India), was an engineer and humanitarian who spent the later part of his life in India. He lived at the ashram of Mahatma Gandhi and took an active part in India's fight for independence—notably in helping to draft a new constitution for the State of Aundh that became the Aundh Experiment. He was a Polish Jew who subsequently converted to Hinduism.

== Biography ==
Frydman came to India in the late 1930s as a Jewish refugee from Warsaw. A successful capitalist, he was managing director of the Mysore State Government Electrical Factory in Bangalore. Eventually he was won over by Hindu philosophy and became a sannyasi. Frydman was instrumental, along with Gandhi and Bhawanrao Shriniwasrao Pant Pratinidhi, the Raja of Aundh, in helping to draft the November Declaration, which handed over rule of the state of Aundh from the Raja to the residents in 1938–9.

He became acquainted with one of the sons of the Raja of Aundh, and was well regarded by the Raja himself. According to the Raja's son, Apa Pant, "Frydman had great influence with my father, and on his seventy-fifth birthday he said, 'Raja Saheb, why don't you go and make a declaration to Mahatma Gandhi that you are giving all power to the people because it will help in the freedom struggle.'"

As a sympathiser with the Indian independence movement, the Raja accepted this idea. Frydman wrote a draft declaration, and the Raja and his son, Apa Pant, travelled to see Gandhi in Wardha, where the Mahatma drew up a new constitution for the state. The constitution, which gave full responsible government to the people of Aundh, was adopted on 21 January 1939. This "Aundh Experiment" was a rare event in pre-independence India, where the rulers of princely states were generally reluctant to give up their power. After some initial hesitation among the populace of the state it proved to be very successful, lasting until the merger of the princely states into India in 1948. It was during this process of giving self governance to the citizens of Aundh, that a question came up about the prisoners. Frydman then took on the responsibility of taking care of the prisoners in an open prison. Later this attracted the attention of the burgeoning film industry in Bombay, known these days as Bollywood. A film Do Aankhen Barah Haath was made, based on this episode. As was typical of Frydman, when it came time for his credits, he absolutely refused to take credit (the maker, V. Shantaram, wanted to give him credit as the technical consultant, during the end credits).

While in India, Frydman became a disciple of Mahatma Gandhi and lived in his ashram, where he made the spinning wheel that Gandhi himself used. Frydman used his engineering skill to create several new types of spinning wheels for Gandhi, which piqued his interest in finding the most efficient and economical spinning wheel for India.

He was close to Nehru, and was associated with Sri Ramana Maharshi and Jiddu Krishnamurti.

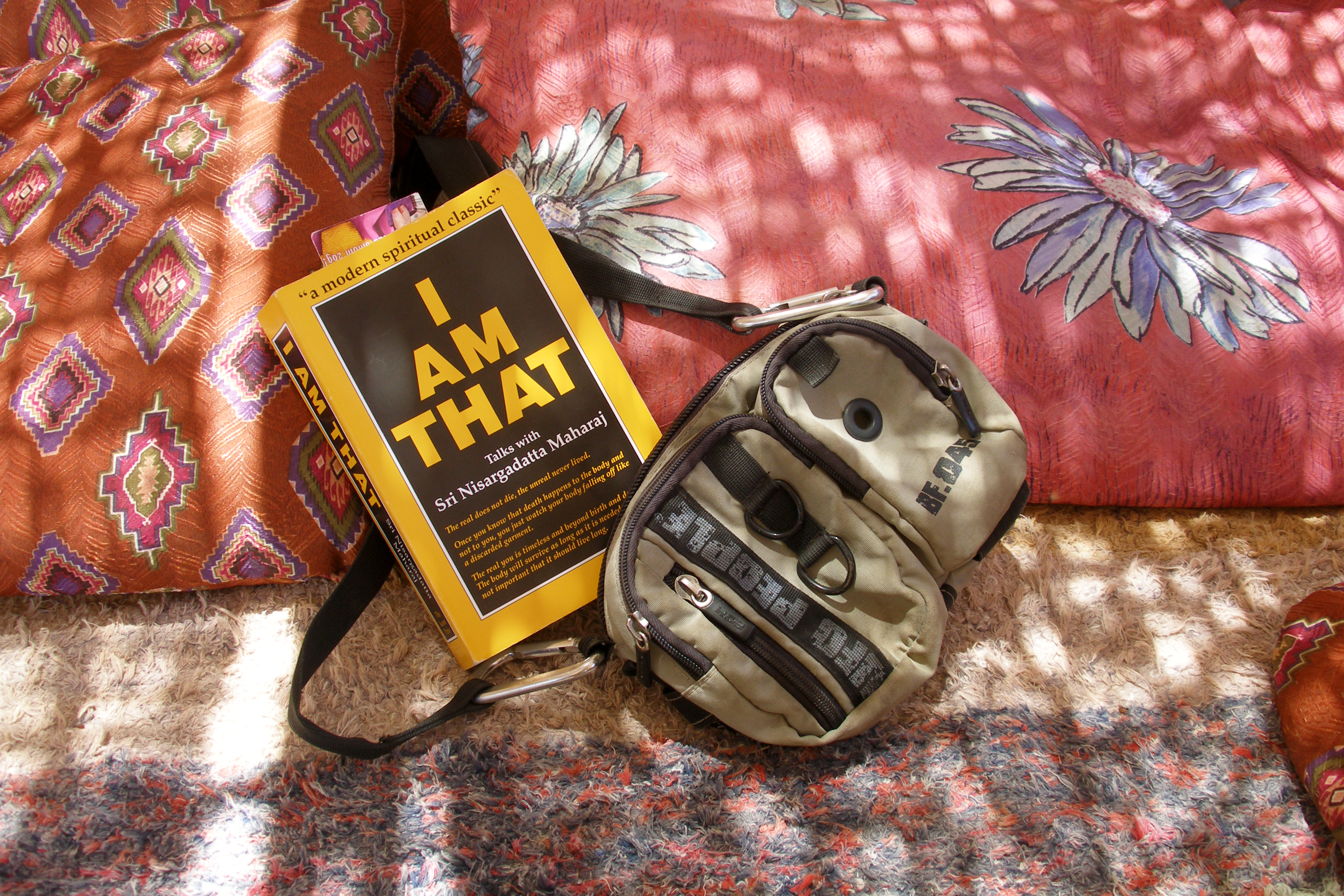
Translated "I Am That".

A longtime friend to Advaita guru Nisargadatta Maharaj, who considered him a Jnani, Maurice Frydman died in 1977 in India, with Sri Nisargadatta by his bedside. Frydman edited and translated Nisargadatta Maharaj's tape-recorded conversations into the English-language book I Am That, published in 1973. I Am That includes an appendix written by Frydman titled 'Nisarga Yoga' which briefly describes this form of yoga.

Frydman helped Wanda Dynowska, a Polish theosophist who came to India in the 1930s, to establish a Polish-Indian Library (Biblioteka Polsko-Indyjska). The library holds a collection of books aimed "to show India to Poland and Poland to India", containing translations from Indian languages to Polish and from Polish to English. During the 2nd World War he helped with the transfer of Polish orphans from Siberia, displaced there by the Soviets after their annexation of Eastern Poland to Siberia in 1939–1941. They were moved from Siberia via Iran (with the Polish army of Gen. Władysław Anders) mainly to India, Kenya and New Zealand. After 1959 he helped Wanda Dynowska with Tibetan refugees in India.

== See also ==
- Inchegeri Sampradaya
- Jiddu Krishnamurti
- Ramana Maharshi

== Bibliography ==
- Allen, Charles; Dwivedi, Sharada. Lives of the Indian Princes. London: Century Publishing (1984). ISBN 0-7126-0910-5.
- Alter, Joseph S. Gandhi's Body. University of Pennsylvania Press, 2000. ISBN 978-0-8122-3556-2.
- Kenneth Ballhatchet, and David D. Taylor. Changing South Asia. Published for the Centre of South Asian Studies in the School of Oriental & African Studies, University of London, by Asian Research Service, 1984.
- Frydman, Maurice. Gandhiji, His Life and Work. Bombay: Karnatak Publishing House, 1944.
- Frydman, Maurice. I Am That, Talks with Sri Nisargadatta Maharaj. Chetana Publishing, Bombay, 1973. ISBN 0-89386-022-0.
- Frydman, Maurice. The World Federation and the Indian National Congress. Aundh Publishing Trust, 1944.
- Gandhi, Mahatma. The Collected Works of Mahatma Gandhi "A Discussion with Maurice Frydman", p. 320.
- Pant, Apa. An Unusual Raja: Mahatma Gandhi and the Aundh Experiment. Sangam Books, 1989. ISBN 978-0-86131-752-3.
- Rothermund, Indira. The Aundh Experiment: A Gandhian Grass-roots Democracy. Somaiya, 1983. ISBN 978-0-8364-1194-2.
