= Parshuram Pant Pratinidhi =

Minister and count of the Maratha Empire

Shrimant Peshwa Parshuram Pant Pratinidhi Pant Pratinidhi

Pratinidhi of the Maratha Empire
- In office 1694 – 1718
- Monarchs: Rajaram I Shivaji II (under Tarabai's regency); Shahu I
- Preceded by: Pralhad Niraji
- Succeeded by: Shripatrao Pant Pratinidhi

5th Peshwa of the Maratha Empire
- In office 1711 – 16 November 1713
- Monarch: Shahu I
- Preceded by: Bahiroji Pingale
- Succeeded by: Balaji Vishwanath

Governor of Aundh
- Succeeded by: Shriniwasrao Parusharam Pant Pratinidhi

Governor of Vishalgad
- Succeeded by: Krishnarao Pant Pratinidhi

Personal details
- Born: 1660 Kinhai, Satara (Satara District, Maharashtra)
- Died: 1718 (aged 57–58) Aundh, Satara, Maratha Empire (Satara District, Maharashtra)
- Children: Krishnarao Pant Pratinidhi; Trimbak Rao Pant; Shriniwasrao Parusharam Pant Pratinidhi (Shripat Rao); Jagjivan Rao Pant Pratinidhi (aka Dadobha); Sadashiv Rao Pant; Godu Bai; Yesu Bai

Parshuram Trimbak Kulkarni (1660–1718), popularly known as Parshuram Pant Pratinidhi, was a Minister (Pradhan) and Count (Sardar) of the Maratha Empire. He served as Pratinidhi (Chief Delegate) during Rajaram I and Tarabai’s reign. His contribution to the War of 27 years is considered to be of vital importance. He was also the founder of the princely states of Vishalgad and Aundh in Maharashtra.

The first hereditary recipient of the title 'Pratinidhi', meaning 'the representative of the king' or viceroy, was Parshuram Trimbak Pant, who was a recorder and interpreter at the court of Shivaji. The title Pratinidhi was conferred upon him in 1698 by Rajaram, the second son of Shivaji.

== Life ==
=== Early life ===
Parshuram Trimbak was born in 1660 in Kanhai village in a Deshastha Brahmin family. His father Trimbak Krishna was a devotional and pious village officer of Kanhai.

=== Career ===
Parashuram started his career as a clerk, but his abilities and valour enabled him, during the reign of Rajaram, to repel the attacks of the Mughal emperor in Maharashtra. He succeeded in the recovery of Satara, Panhala and other fortresses and in re-establishing Maratha power. He had already been a nobleman but in view of his meritorious services, Rajaram conferred upon him the title of Pratinidhi, after the death of Pralhad Niraji, the first holder of the office. Rajaram was succeeded by his wife Tarabai who retained Parashuram Trimbak as Pratinidhi.

== Death ==
Parshuram Trimbak Pant Pratinidhi died in Mahuli, near Satara, in 1718 and was succeeded by his third son Shripatrao Pratinidhi as Pratinidhi of Aundh State and the Vishalgad estate was succeeded by his first son Krishnarao Pant Pratinidhi.

== See also ==
- Pant Pratinidhi family

== Bibliography ==
- Pant, Apa (1989). An Unusual Raja: Mahatma Gandhi and the Aundh Experiment. Sangam Books. ISBN 9780861317523.
- Bond, J.W (2006). Indian States: A Biographical, Historical, and Administrative Survey. Asian Educational Services. ISBN 9788120619654.
- Pant, Apa (1990). An Extended Family Or Fellow Pilgrims. Sangam Books. ISBN 9780863111099.
