= Puntambekar =

Indian Surname

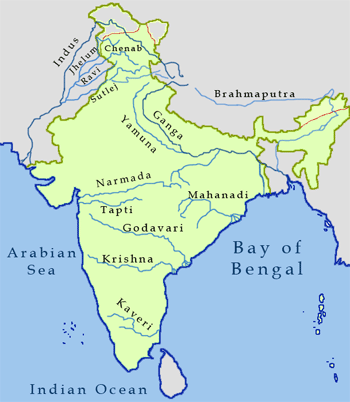
The location of state of Maharashtra in India and the original home of Puntambekars. (left). Puntamba is on the banks of the holy Godavari river. Puntambekars and other Deshastha brahmins originally inhabited the region between the Krishna and Godavari rivers (right)

Puntambekar is an Indian surname. It is found amongst Marathi speaking Deshastha Brahmin and Karhade Brahmin communities of Maharashtra. Marathi surnames are created by adding the suffix -kar to the family's town of origin; therefore, people originating from the town of Puntamba take the name Puntambekar.

== Puntamba ==
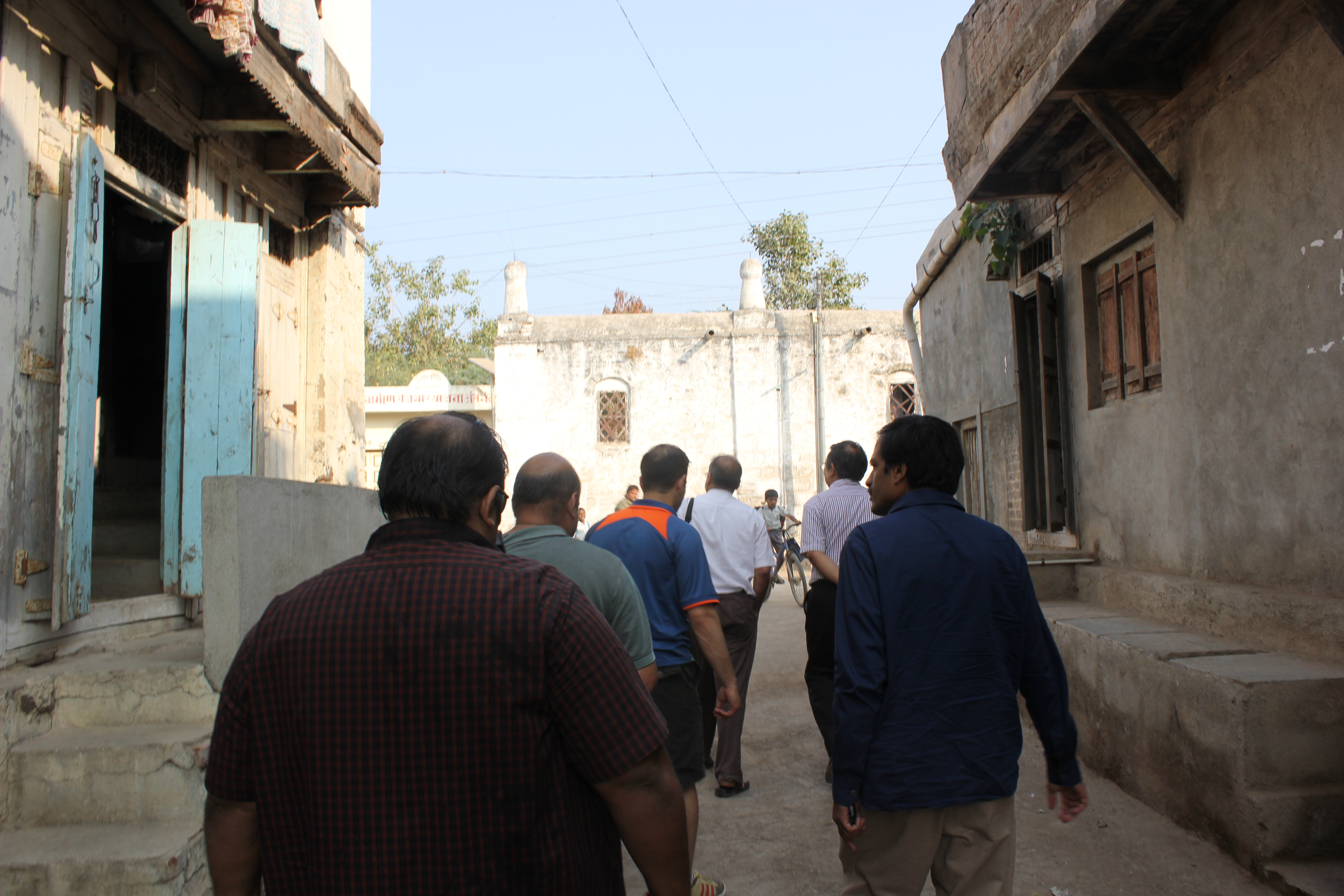
An old street in the village of Puntamba

The ancestors of Puntambekar originally hail from the town of Puntamba. It is an ancient town situated on the banks of the Godavari river in Rahata taluka, Ahmednagar district in the Indian state of Maharashtra. It is believed that the village was named by merging two town places 'Punyastambha' and 'Tambilindanapur'. The village history began in the early 1st millennium Shalivahana era.

Being on the banks of the Godavari which is sacred to Hindus, the town has been a place of pilgrimage. There are many Hindu Temples in the town. Historically, the town has been a center for the learning of Hindu scriptures, with traditional schools (Ved shala) to impart that knowledge. The 14th and the final resting place of the sage Changdev is located in the town. is surrounded by a town wall (called 'Tatabandi' in Marathi). Many traditional houses called "vada" with courtyards are found in the village.

== Diaspora ==
Location of Puntamba and towns where Puntambekar have settled over the centuries. Hover over the dot to see the town name.

Because of their expertise in hindu scriptures as well in administration, deshastha brahmins in general found opportunities to use these skills in different regions of India over the centuries. Some of them including Puntambekars from Maharashtra went to the Hindu holy city of Varanasi (also known as Kashi) many centuries ago. These clans had expertise in particular areas of Sanskrit literature. The Puntamkars were known for their work on logic. The Puntambekar clan in Kashi has abbreviated the surname to "Puntamkar". The clan was one of seven prominent ones from Maharashtra who became the city's intellectual elites in the early Mughal era or even earlier. The others included Sesa, Bhat, Dharmadhikari, Bharadvaja, Payagunde, and Chowdhuri. These Brahmins were collectively called Dakshinatya Brahmins. The clans dominated the study of Sanskrit scriptures and Hindu laws for many centuries. These clans had expertise in particular areas of Sanskrit literature. The Puntamkars were known for their work on logic. Some clans probably migrated during the expansion of Maratha power or later during British colonial rule to serve the Maratha states of Gwalior, Indore, Baroda, and others in Central India. Some Puntambekars served Maratha rulers in southern India at Thanjavur, Arcot and parts of Karnataka. This clan worships Renuka Devi. One branch of Puntambekars had no male heir, so they adopted the youngest son of Moreshwar Patwardhan and Laxmibai Patwardhan of Chiplun in the 18th century. This adoption process is known as the Dattak process in Marathi language. The next generation of this boy was given a village, Anagar, near Solapur, as a fief (Vatan in Marathi /Urdu). Thereafter this branch acquired the surname Anagare. This branch then settled in Mumbai. Kuldaiwat of this branch is 'Mahalaxmi' of Kolhapur.

One branch of the Rigvedi family settled in Chiplun, a town in Ratnagiri district on the Konkan coast of Maharashtra. The Chiplun group belongs to the Vasishta gotra. The family deity, Kuladaiwat, is the Shree Yamai Devi of Aundh in the Satara district of Maharashtra, India. Members of this family moved to what was known as East Africa during the British colonial period nearly a century ago. Members of this Puntambekar clan settled in the United Kingdom and the United States.

== Clans ==
Surname	Other Surnames used	Brahmin Sub-caste and Shakha (Sub-sect)	Gotra (Rishi Lineage)	Kuladevata (Family Deity - Goddess) / Kuladaivat (Family Deity - God)	Town of Origin, Other towns lived in
Puntambekar	Puntham-Baker	Deshastha Rigvedi	Vasishtha	Yamai of Aundh	Puntamba, Chiplun (from the 1800s), East Africa, UK, USA
Puntambekar	Puntamkar	Unknown	Bharadwaj	Shree Bhavani of Tuljapur	Puntamba, Banaras (from the 1700s)
Puntambekar	Angare	Unknown	Unknown	Mahalaxmi of Kolhapur	Puntamba, Angar, and Mumbai
Puntambekar	Rao, Punthambaker	Smartha Deshasta Rigvedi	Kashyap	Renuka	Puntamba, Arcot (from the 1700s) & Tanjore region from 1674
Puntambekar	Darmadhikari	Smartha Deshasta Shukla Yajurvedi	Laugaksha	Sheshambai(Shakambhari Devi from Bhilkot, Zodge)	Puntamba

== Notables ==
- Dr. Shankar Puntambekar - noted writer in Hindi language.
