= I Am That =

Book by Nisargadatta Maharaj

- Cover
- Editor: Sudhakar S. Dikshit
- Author: Sri Nisargadatta Maharaj
- Translator: Maurice Frydman
- Language: English
- Subject: Shiva Advaita philosophy
- Publisher: Chetana Publishing
- Publication date: 1973
- Publication place: India
- Media type: Print
- ISBN: 0-89386-022-0
- OCLC: 63243276

I Am That (soham) is a compilation of talks on nonduality by Sri Nisargadatta Maharaj, a Hindu spiritual teacher who lived in Mumbai. The English translation of the book from the original Marathi recordings was done by Maurice Frydman, edited by Sudhakar S. Dixit and first published in 1973 by Chetana Publications. The book was revised and reedited in July 1981. These publications led to the spread of Nisargadatta's teachings to the West, especially North America and Europe. Excerpts of the book were published in Yoga Journal in September 1981, the month Nisargadatta died at age 84.

== Title ==
"I am that", soham, is a Sanskrit mantra pointing to one's true identity as the Divine or centerless awareness.

== Background and publication history ==
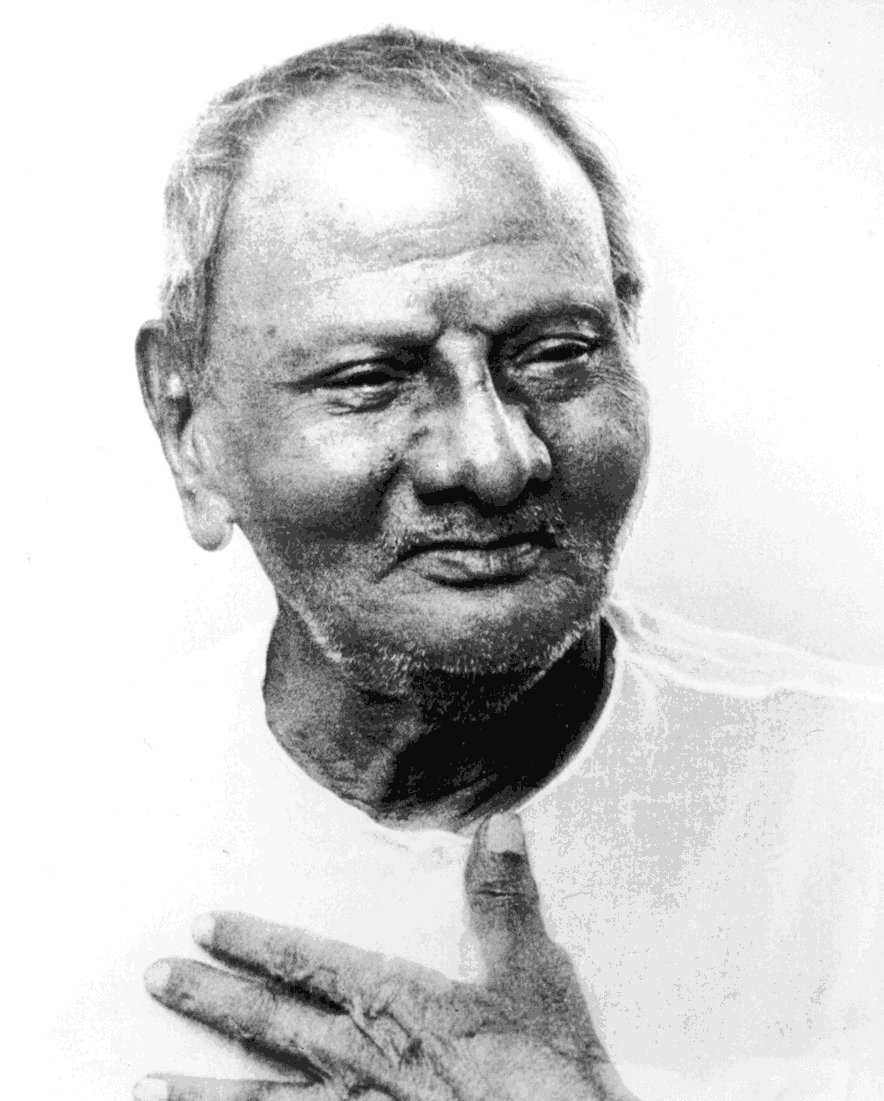
Nisargadatta Maharaj (1897–1981)

Nisargadatta Maharaj met his guru, Siddharameshwar Maharaj, in 1933. Siddharameshwar died two and half years later, and Nisargadatta continued to practice what his guru had taught him while running a small shop in Khetwadi locality in Girgaon, Mumbai. In 1951, after receiving an inner revelation from his guru, he began to give initiations. He allowed devotees to gather twice a day for satsang, with meditation, bhajan-singing, and the answering of questions, continuing until his death on 8 September 1981, at the age of 84.

Maurice Frydman, a Jewish refugee from Warsaw, came to India in the late 1930s. Initially, he worked at the State Government Electric Factory in Bangalore. Later, influenced by Mahatma Gandhi, he worked in Aundh State (the present Satara district) on the Aundh Experiment for local self-governance. Thereafter he took sannyas (renunciation). He was associated with Sri Ramana Maharshi and J. Krishnamurti. Eventually he became a disciple of Sri Nisargadatta Maharaj in the early days of Nisargadatta's spiritual work in 1965. Frydman spoke Marathi and so became a translator of Nisargadatta's talks. He recorded and compiled the sessions, leading to the publication of I Am That.

Most of the conversations were in Marathi, but for the benefit of Westerners talks were often translated. Frydman: ″Whenever I was present the task would fall to me. Many of the questions put and answers given were so interesting and significant that a tape-recorder was brought in. While most of the tapes were of the regular Marathi-English variety, some were polyglot scrambles of several Indian and European languages. Later, each tape was deciphered and translated into English″ .

All the conversations were recorded at Nisargadatta's small tenement and later transcribed and translated by Frydman while the master was still unknown to the Western public. A Marathi version of the talks, verified by Nisargadatta, was published separately.

According to Nisargadatta, "Maurice (Frydman) told me, 'Everything that is said here is immediately lost, though it could be of a great benefit for those looking for truth. I would like to translate and publish your words so others might know them. And so, he wrote I Am That".

With the book's publication, Nisargadatta became very popular: hundreds of foreigners started flocking to his small tenement, and Nisargadatta once remarked: ″I used to have a quiet life but the book I Am That by Maurice has turned my house into a railway station platform.″

I Am That was initially rejected by the major publishers, so Frydman worked with a then small publisher, Chetana Publications. The book was first published in 1973 in two hardcover volumes. The revised and enlarged second edition was published in one volume in 1976. The first paperback was published in 1984. The book is now published in the USA and Canada by The Acorn Press.

== Structure ==
The book comprises 101 sections, each corresponding to a particular conversation, averaging four pages each and cast in a question-and-answer format. Most deal with a single issue but some go from one subject to other, always in line with the spiritual quest. The second edition includes an epilogue, Nisarga Yoga, by Maurice Frydman.

== Translations ==
I Am That has been translated into several languages, including Dutch, Italian and Hebrew.

== Reception ==
The book is considered a spiritual classic by authors and teachers like Eckhart Tolle, Wayne Dyer, Deepak Chopra Peter Crone and Adyashanti, who called the book a "standout" and "the clearest expression I've ever found." Dyer calls Nisargadatta his teacher, and cites the quotation, "Love says: 'I am everything'. Wisdom says: 'I am nothing'. Between the two my life flows." That quotation has also been cited by several other authors in diverse fields, from wellness to cooking. Joseph Goldstein visited Nisargadatta in January 1980 after reading the book, and after several meetings said, "The path that Nisargadatta revealed was not a search, but a find, not a struggle, but an abiding, not a cultivation, but something intrinsic to all".

== See also ==
- Samarth Ramdas
- Advaita vedanta
- Navnath Sampradaya
- Siddharameshwar Maharaj

== Bibliography ==
- Stephen H. Wolinsky (2000). I Am That I Am: A Tribute to Sri Nisargadatta Maharaj. Quantum Inst. ISBN 0967036259.
- Nisargadatta Maharaj; Jean Dunn (1990). Prior to Consciousness: Talks with Sri Nisargadatta Maharaj. Acorn Press. ISBN 978-0-89386-024-0.
- Nisargadatta Maharaj; Robert Powell (2006). The Ultimate Medicine: Dialogues with a Realized Master. North Atlantic Books. ISBN 978-1-55643-633-8.
- Nisargadatta Maharaj; Vasistha (2010). The Seven Steps to Awakening. Freedom Religion Press. ISBN 978-0-9797267-6-7.
