= Satwalekar =

Satwalekar is an Indian surname predominantly found among Marathi and Konkani communities in Maharashtra and Goa.

Notable people with the surname include:

- Shripad Damodar Satwalekar (1867–1968), Indian Sanskrit scholar, Vedic commentator, painter, and recipient of the Padma Bhushan
  - Madhav Satwalekar (1915–2006), Indian painter and art educator; son of Shripad Damodar Satwalekar
    - Vikas Satwalekar (1944–2020), Indian graphic designer and former Executive Director of the National Institute of Design (NID); son of Madhav Satwalekar
