= Shirke =

Clan in Maharashtra and Goa, India

The Shirke is a clan of Kuli Marathas. They primarily reside in Maharashtra and its bordering states.

== History ==
During the 15th century, under the Bahamani Sultanate, and in the 16th and 17th century, under the successor Deccan sultanates of Adilshahi and Nizamshahi, the Shirke clan held Deshmukhi rights in the areas of coastal Konkan, and some inland areas of Western Maharashtra. During the Bahamani era, the seat of the Shirke fief was at Khelna (Vishalgad). The Shirkes intermarried with the Surves and kept command over their regions. In the mid-17th century, Shivaji, the founder of Maratha Empire, made the Surves and Shirkes join him, by force or by forming marital alliances.

The Shirkes were relatives of Bhosale rulers such as Shahaji, Shivaji, Sambhaji, Rajaram and Shahu. The Shirke were relations and confidantes of the Raja Pratapsinha of the short lived Satara state. In 1839, he sent a member of the Shirke family to London to plead his case of restoring him to power.

== See also ==
- Maratha clan system
- List of Maratha dynasties and states
- Bhonsle (clan)
- Gaekwad
- House of Scindia
- Parmar (clan)

== Bibliography ==
- Gordon, Stewart (1993), The Marathas 1600–1818, Cambridge University Press, ISBN 978-0-521-26883-7
  - Gordon, Stewart (2007). The Marathas 1600–1818. Cambridge University Press. ISBN 978-0-521-03316-9.

=== Further reading ===
- S.R. Bakshi (1 January 2003). Advanced history of medieval India. Anmol Publications PVT. LTD. pp. 391–. ISBN 978-81-7488-028-4.
