= Krishnarao Pant Pratinidhi =

Indian general

Shrimant Krishnarao Parshuram Pant Pratinidhi
- Preceded by: Parshuram Pant Pratinidhi
- Succeeded by: Amrutrao Krishnaji Pant, Pratinidhi

Pratinidhi to Tarabai in Kolhapur
- In office 1716–unknown

1st Chief of Vishalgad
- In office 1716–unknown

Personal details
- Born: 1684 Aundh, Satara (Satara District, Maharashtra)
- Died: Unknown Vishalgad, Kolhapur (Kolhapur District, Maharashtra)
- Children: Gangadhar Rao Pant; Amrutrao Krishnaji Pant Pratinidhi; Trimbakrao Krishnaji Pant; Shivram Krishnaji Pant
- Parent: Parshuram Pant Pratinidhi (father)

Krishnarao Pant Pratinidhi (also known as Krishnaji Parshuram) was a 17th-century Maratha general and Pratinidhi of Tarabai in Kolhapur, India.

== Early life ==
Born in a Deshastha Brahmin family, in 1713 Shahu I awarded the Vishalgad jagir to Parashuram Trimbak. Parashuram Trimbak sent his son Krishna to assume the management of fort and the jagir, but he no sooner obtained possession than he revolted tendered his services to Sambhaji II. He was appointed as Pratinidhi by Raja of Kolhapur Sambhaji II. Soon after the revolt Krishnaji established Vishalgad jagir in 1716. Krishnarao Pant Pratinidhi was the first Chief of Vishalgad.
