= Jagjivanrao Pant Pratinidhi =

Pratinidhi to the Emperor Shahu of Maratha Empire 3rd Chief of Aundh
- Reign: 1746–1749
- Coronation: 1746
- Predecessor: Shripatrao Pant Pratinidhi
- Successor: Shrinivasrao Gangadhar
- Born: 1691; Aundh, Satara (Satara District, Maharashtra)
- Died: 1754 (aged 62–63); Aundh, Satara (Satara District, Maharashtra)
- Father: Parshuram Pant Pratinidhi

Jagjivan Rao Pant Pratinidhi (also known as Dadoba) served as Pratinidhi (Chief Delegate) during Chhatrapati Shahu I reign. He was the younger brother of Shripatrao Pant Pratinidhi. He succeeded as Pratinidhi after the death of his brother in 1691 at the age of fifty-five.

== Early life ==
Jagjivan Rao, was born in 1691, the fourth son of Parshuram Pant Pratinidhi.

== See also ==
- Pant Pratinidhi family

== Bibliography ==
- Udgaonkar, P.B (1986). Political Institutions & Administration. Motilal Banarsidass Publications.
- Bond, J.W (2006). Indian States: A Biographical, Historical, and Administrative Survey. Asian Educational Services.
- Pant, Apa (1990). An Extended Family Or Fellow Pilgrims. Sangam Books.
- Kulkarni, A.R. (2008). The Marathas. Diamond Publications.
- Vaidya, Sushila (2000). Role of women in Maratha politics, 1620-1752 A.D. Sharada Publication House.
