= Ballhatchet =

Ballhatchet or Balhatchet may refer to:

- Ivan Balhatchet, British police office
- Kenneth A. Ballhatchet (1922 – 1995), British historian
