= Shripatrao Pant Pratinidhi =

General of the Maratha Empire

Shrimant Shriniwasrao Parshuram Pant Pratinidhi
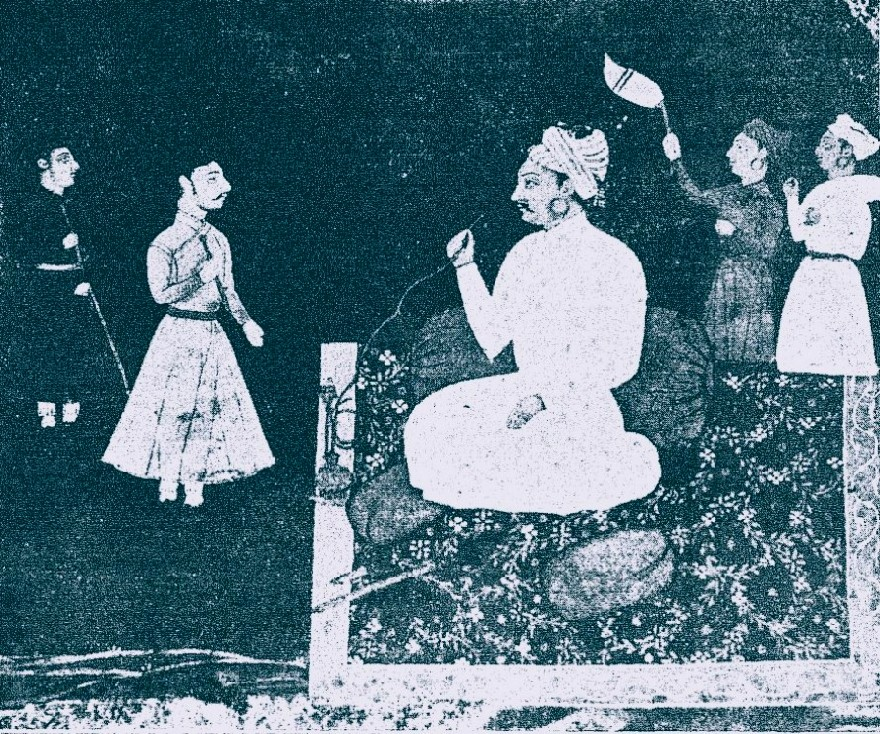

Pratinidhi to the Emperor Shahu I of the Maratha Empire
- In office 1718–1746
- Preceded by: Parshuram Pant Pratinidhi
- Succeeded by: Jagjivan Parshuram

2nd Chief of Aundh
- In office 1718–1746

Personal details
- Born: 1687 Aundh, Satara (Satara District, Maharashtra)
- Died: 1746 (aged 58–59) Aundh, Satara (Satara District, Maharashtra)
- Parent: Parshuram Pant Pratinidhi (father)

Shriniwasrao Parshuram (1687 – 1746 CE), popularly known as Shripatrao Pratinidhi or Shripatrao Pant Pratinidhi, was a General of the Maratha Empire. He served as Pratinidhi (Chief Delegate) during Shahu I's reign. After the death of his father Parshuram Pant Pratinidhi in 1718, Shripat Rao won the favour of Shahu by his brilliant efforts as a soldier fighting many battles in the defence of the Maratha Empire. In 1718, he was appointed as the Pant Pratinidhi of Maratha Empire.

Shripatrao was not only a very able administrator and organizer, but a great statesman too. His work to consolidate the Maratha Raj has been praised by most of its historians. Shahu Maharaj depended upon the advice of Shripatrao. If owing to some unavoidable reasons Rao didn't present at the court at the usual hour the king would go to his house and inquire about him. Thus Shripatrao, unlike his father had no problem of loyalty to Chhatrapati

Shripatrao was asked by peshwas to establish his headquarters at Poona. Rao consistently refused to do so. He wanted to be at the side of King of the Maratha Empire.

In 1719, on the orders of Chhatrapati Shahu Maharaj, he colonized Sangam Mahuli. There he and his family built various temples.

== Early life ==
Shripatrao, was born in 1687 in the Deshastha Brahmin family of the Pant Pratinidhi, when Parshuram Trimbak was twenty- seven years old. He must have been deeply influenced by his father. He had lived a life of turmoil as well as of glory, and benefited from it. Shahu Maharaj had great respect and regard for Parshuram Pant Pratinidhi.

== Campaigns ==
=== Campaign against Khatav ===
Krishnaji Khatavkar had received the pargana of Khatav in 1689 A.D from the Mughal Emperor, Aurangazeb. He refused to accede to the Shahu's authority and had become overbearing. Shripatrao marched towards Khatav and defeated him in battle. Submitting to Shahu's authority was appreciated by Shahu, who released Shripatrao's father.

=== Karnataka expeditions ===
In between 1724 and 1727, the Marathas led two expeditions into the Karnataka, one led jointly by Shripatrao Pratinidhi, Peshwa Bajirao I and the Sarlashkar, and the other by Peshwa and Senapati.

The first Karnatak expedition, which lasted for two years, from November 1724 and May 1726, led by Fateh Singh Bhonsale, accompanied by both Shripatrao Pratinidhi and Bajirao I, proved to be futile. The Nizam gave lukewarm support to Marathas. However he regarded the south as his sphere of influence and did not want Marathas to interfere with it. He therefore gave secret instructions to officers to thwart the plans of Marathas in Karnatak. The Maratha leaders who led this campaign could not shed their differences. The Marathas could not realize their objective in this campaign.

The second Karnatak expedition was led by Bajirao him in October 1727. The Pratinidhi who was secretly negotiating with the Nizam, who was rewarded with a personal jagir i Varhad by Nizam. Bajirao therefore did not associate with Pratinidhi with this expedition. He besieged the fort of Serinaapatnam and succeeded in levying chauth and Sardeshmukhi from the rulers of Mysore and Arcot.

== Death ==
After the death of Shripatrao Pratinidhi in 1746 Shahu Maharaj made his younger brother, Jagjivan Parshuram the next Pratinidhi. Jagjivan parashuram was the youngest son of Parashuram Trimbak Pant. He was born in 1691 and became Pratinidhi at the age of fifty-five.

== See also ==
- Pant Pratinidhi family

== Bibliography ==
- Udgaonkar, P. B. (1986). Political Institutions & Administration. Motilal Banarsidass Publications. ISBN 9788120820876.
- Bond, J. W. (2006). Indian States: A Biographical, Historical, and Administrative Survey. Asian Educational Services. ISBN 9788120619654.
- Pant, Apa (1990). An Extended Family Or Fellow Pilgrims. Sangam Books. ISBN 9780863111099.
- Kulkarni, A. R. (2008). The Marathas. Diamond Publications. ISBN 9788184830736.
- Vaidya, Sushila (2000). Role of Women in Maratha Politics, 1620-1752 A.D. Sharada Publication House. ISBN 9788185616674.
