= Pralhad Niraji =

Pant Pratinidhi of the Maratha Empire

Pralhad Niraji popularly known as Pralhad Pant, was the Pant Pratinidhi of the Maratha Empire during the reign of Chatrapathi Rajaram I. He was the first occupant of the position of Pant Pratinidhi. He is remembered for his splendid contribution in strengthening the Maratha Empire by way of loyalty, diplomacy and exceptional sacrifice.

== Early life ==
Pralhad Niraji was the son of the Nyayadish Niraji Raoji.

== Career ==
After the death of the Chatrapathi Sambhaji, the Ashta Pradhan mandal fell to pieces. During these critical days of the Maratha kingdom under Rajaram it was Pralhad Niraji, who came to the front and exercised considerable influence in Maratha politics. But the most influential man at that time was Ramchandra Pant Amatya, whose father Abbaji Sondev had been Shivaji's military commander.

== Death ==
Pralhad Niraj died in 1694.

== Bibliography ==
- Bond, J.W (2006). Indian States: A Biographical, Historical, and Administrative Survey. Asian Educational Services. ISBN 9788120619654.
- Ranade, Mahadeo Govind (2017). Rise of Maratha Power. Publications Division Ministry of Information & Broadcasting. ISBN 9788123025117.
- Chitnis, Krishnaji Nageshrao (2003). Medieval Indian History. Atlantic Publishers & Dist. ISBN 9788171560622.
- Sardesai, Govind. New History of the Marathas Volume 1. Mumbai: Phoenix Publications. ISBN 8121500664.
