= Apa Pant =

Indian diplomat, Prince of Aundh, Gandhian, writer and freedom fighter

His Excellency Apasaheb Balasaheb Pant PS
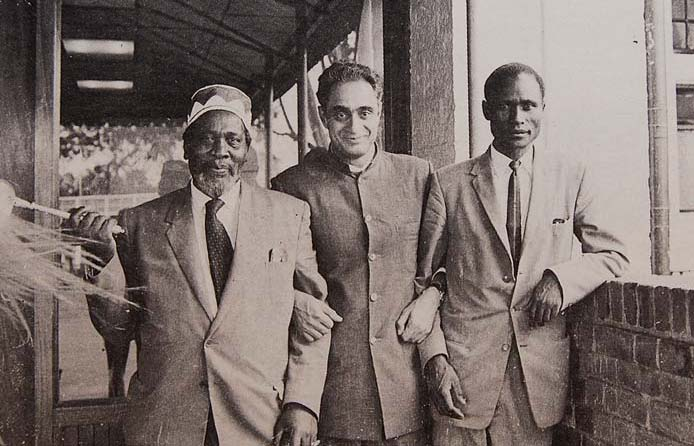
- Jomo Kenyatta, Apa Pant and Achieng Oneko

High Commissioner of India to the United Kingdom
- In office 15 September 1969 – October 1972
- Preceded by: S. S. Dhawan
- Succeeded by: Braj Kumar Nehru

Personal details
- Born: 11 September 1912 Aundh State, British India (present-day Maharashtra, India)
- Died: 5 October 1992 (aged 80) Pune, Maharashtra, India
- Parent: Bhawanrao Shriniwasrao Pant Pratinidhi (father)
- Education: University of Bombay; University of Oxford
- Occupation: Diplomat, freedom fighter
- Awards: Padma Shri (1954)

Appasaheb Pant (1912–1992), also known as Apa Pant, Appa Pant, Appa Sahib Pant, Appsaheb Balasaheb Pant, Parashuram-rao Pant (Parashuram being his first name), was an Indian diplomat, Prince of Aundh, Gandhian, writer and freedom fighter. A philosopher by nature and a mystic at heart, who served for over forty years as a career diplomat for the Indian Government. He served as the Indian Commissioner at various African countries such as Kenya, Uganda, Tanganyika, Zanzibar, Northern Rhodesia, Southern Rhodesia, Nyasaland and the Belgian colony of the Congo and, later, as the Indian ambassador to countries like Indonesia, Norway, Egypt, United Kingdom and Italy. He also served as the Political Officer for India in the Kingdom of Sikkim. The Government of India honoured him in 1954 with the award of Padma Shri, the fourth highest Indian civilian award for his contributions to the society, placing him among the first recipients of the award.

== Biography ==
Appa Sahib Bala Saheb Pant was born on 11 September 1912 in the Aundh, Satara capital city of princely state of Aundh in the British India, presently near Satara in the Indian state of Maharashtra, as the second son of Bhawanrao Shriniwasrao Pant Pratinidhi, the ruler of the state. His mother died when he was two and a half years old. After schooling at local institutions, he graduated (BA) from the University of Mumbai and studied philosophy, politics and economics at Brasenose College, Oxford. He continued his studies in London and passed Barrister at Law from Lincoln's Inn and returned to India in 1937 when the Indian freedom movement was gathering pace.

Pant married Nalini Devi, a medical doctor and a fellow of the Royal College of Surgeons in 1942 and the couple had three children, Aditi, Aniket and Avalokita.

Pant died, aged 80, on 5 October 1992, succumbing to old age illnesses.

== Political and diplomatic career ==
Pant started his political and diplomatic career as the minister of education of the Aundh State in 1944 when his father was the ruler of the state. His tenure lasted one year and during this period and thereafter, he was involved in the discussions related to the integration of the state into Indian Union. After India's independence, he entered Indian Foreign Service, was deputed to Africa and worked in Kenya, Uganda, Tanganyika, Zanzibar, Northern Rhodesia, Southern Rhodesia, Nyasaland and the Belgian colony of the Congo. In 1954, he was appointed as the officer on special duty with the minister of external affairs when India's relationship with China was strained. He represented India at Bandung Conference in 1956 for the formation of Non-Aligned Movement. He also worked as the officer in charge of the missions of Tibet and Bhutan and Sikkim, and as ambassador to Indonesia (1961–64), Norway (1964–66), Egypt (1966–69), United Kingdom (1969–72) and Italy (1972–75).

== Literary career ==
Apasaheb Pant was a former judge for the Templeton Prize, an international recognition honouring the "entrepreneurship of spirit", He published eight books towards the latter part of his life.

- Surya Namaskar, an Ancient Indian Exercise (1970)
- Towards Socialist Transformation of Indian Economy (1973)
- A Moment in Time (1974)
- Mandala: An Awakening (1976)
- Survival of the Individual (1983)
- Undiplomatic Incidents (1987)
- An Unusual Raja – Mahatma Gandhi and the Aundh Experiment (1989)
- An Extended Family of Fellow Pilgrims (1990)

== Awards ==
In 1954, he was awarded the Padma Shri, the fourth highest Indian civilian award, for his contributions to the society. He was among the first recipients of the award.

== See also ==
- Pant Pratinidhi family
- Bhawanrao Shriniwasrao Pant Pratinidhi
