= Kinhai =

Village in Maharashtra, India

- Village
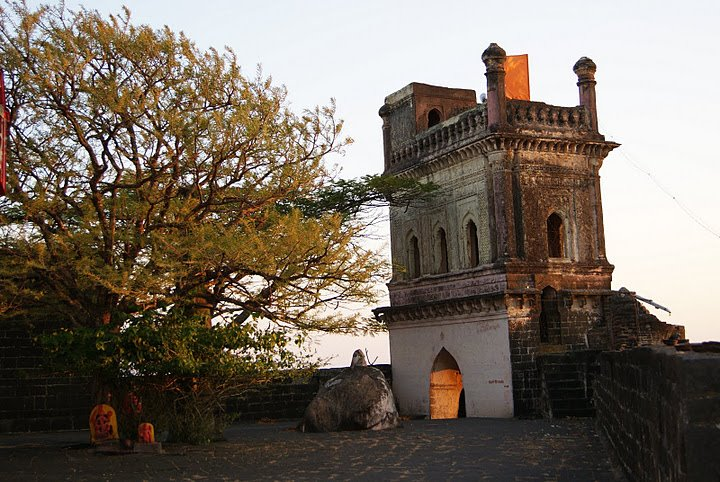

- Location in Maharashtra, India
- Coordinates: 17.788127°N 74.171672°E
- Country: India
- State: Maharashtra
- Region: West India
- District: Satara
- Taluka: Koregaon
- Established: 16th century

Government
  - Body: Gram Panchayat
- Demonym: Kinhaikar

Languages
  - Official: Marathi
- Time zone: UTC+5:30 (IST)
- Postal code: 415021
- Telephone code: (+91)2371
- Vehicle registration: MH 11
- Nearest city: Satara
- Website: www.maharashtra.gov.in

Kinhai is a village located in Koregaon Taluka, Satara District in Maharashtra, India. The village is divided into Pantanchi Kinhai on the western side and Peth Kinhai to the east. It is located 7 miles (11 km) north of Koregaon, at 2,320 ft (710 m) above sea level. As of the 2011 Indian census, Kinhai had a population of 3,360.

== History ==
In 965 CE, the village, then known as Kinhika, was donated to a Brahmin named Navashiv. It fell under the administrative unit of Ramtirthika.

Kinhai was a village of the former princely state of Aundh and was included in Koregaon Taluka after the merger of the princely states.

The Pratinidhi families were hereditary Kulkarnis or accountants of Kinhai and several of the neighbouring villages and it was from that position that Parashuram Trimbak raised himself till he was appointed the third Pratinidhi in 1700.

In 1749, Sakhargadnivasini Temple (meaning "she who resides on top of the hill called sugar-fort") was completed. In 2014, the temple underwent a restoration effort which received a UNESCO Asia-Pacific Heritage Award.

== Geography ==
The village lies on the banks of a feeder of the Vasna River. To the north and north-west is a spur of steep hills at the end of which rises the ancient fort of Kalyangad (nowadays Nandgiri) (3,537 ft).
