= Battle of Khelna =

1701–1702 battle

Date	26 December 1701 – 6 June 1702 (5 months, 1 week and 4 days)
Location	Khelna
Result	Mughal victory

Belligerents
Maratha Kingdom	Mughal Empire

Commanders and leaders
Parashurampant (surrendered); Dhanaji Jadhav	Asad Khan

Casualties and losses
Unknown	6,000

The Battle of Khelna occurred between the Mughal Empire and Maratha Kingdom between 1701 and 1702. Mughal emperor Aurangzeb ordered for the Fort of Khelna to be besieged. Mughal general Asad Khan launched an offensive and besieged the fortress. After about a three-month siege, Maratha commander, Parashurampant surrendered under the condition that he and his garrison would be allowed to march out unharmed.
