= Kalyangad =

Historical fort in Maharashtra, India

Kalyangad Fort
- Part of Mahadev Hill Range
- Satara District, Maharashtra, India

Site information
- Type: Hill fort
- Owner: Government of India
- Controlled by: Maratha Empire (1673-1818) United Kingdom: East India Company (1818-1857); British Raj (1857-1947); India (1947-)
- Open to the public: Yes
- Condition: Ruined

Location
- India
- Location within Maharashtra
- Coordinates: 17.7784416°N 74.1264734°E
- Height: 3537 feet

Site history
- Materials: Basalt stone

Kalyangad Fort/Nandgiri is a historical fort located in the Koregaon Taluka (administrative unit) of Satara district of Maharashtra, India. The fort stands at the end of a spur of the Mahadev mountain range running south-west from the villages of Vikhale and Bhadle, eight miles north of Koregaon and about fourteen miles north-east of Satara. Its elevation is 3,537 feet or 1,067 to 1,078 meters above sea level.

== History ==
According to tradition the fort was built by the Silahara king Bhoj II, of Panhala. In 1673 it was surrendered, along with other Satara forts, to Shivaji. and kalyangad fort under sardar ratoji bhoite. The Pratinidhi administered it until his struggle with Bajirao, the second Peshwa (1720–1740). In 1791, Major Price described it as looking like the hull of a ship of war, with another hill opposite it with some places of devotion on its summit. In the last Maratha war, it fell to the army of General Pritzler in April 1818. In 1862, it was described as a dismantled and uninhabited fort with a steep approach and a strong gateway, but no water and no supplies.

== How to reach ==
The base village is Nandgiri (Dhumalwadi), which is connected by motorable road. The trek to the fort requires 45 minutes to reach the top.

== Features ==
The fort has two gateways, one below the other, connected by steps. The first gate faces north, the path turning abruptly as it is reached. Within is a hollow used formerly for stores. From the inside facing east is another cave pond called the Gavi, full of good water. The entrance to it is protected by a wall. This cave pond is very hard to access, the way being thickly blocked with prickly pear. The second gateway of mortared stone leads out into the plateau, which is about two hundred yards high by one hundred yards high with many ruined buildings, and four chief ponds inside the second gate. The fort walls are in a state of bad repair. There are no buildings inside the fort except the temple of God Maruti. There are also idols of Dattatraya and Parasnath. Even though water is available abundantly, there is no habitation on the fort. The temple of Maruti was renovated by Dahanebuva of Ninapadali. The tomb of Abdul Karim, a Musalman Saint, inside the fort is still visited by a few people. An Urus is held in his honour for five days before Holi Paurnima. The fort was the headquarters of an administrative sub-division with a treasury and had an establishment of a mamlatdar, phadnis, sabnis, havaldar and daffedar, two karkuns, three naiks, and one hundred and sixty sepoys.
