= Wanda Dynowska =

Polish-Indian theosophist, writer, translator, publisher and social activist

- Born: Wanda Dynowska; 30 June 1888; Sankt-Petersburg, Russian Empire
- Died: 20 March 1971 (aged 82); Mysore, Mysore State, India
- Other names: Umadevi; Tenzin Chodon
- Citizenship: Poland (former); India
- Occupations: Writer; Publisher; Translator; Theosophist
- Known for: Founder of the Indo-Polish Library

Wanda Dynowska (30 June 1888 – 20 March 1971) is a Polish-Indian theosophist, writer, translator, publisher, social activist, promoter of intercultural exchanges between India and Poland, jogini, foundress of the Indo-Polish Library.

== Biography ==
Born in Sankt-Petersburg (then in Russian Empire) to Eustachy Dynowski and Helena Dynowska into a family of Polish nobility. Studied in Kraków and Lausanne. From 1919 she became an active promoter of theosophy in Poland. She was general secretary for Poland in Theosophical Society.

In 1935, Dynowska came to India and got involved in new Hindu religious movements (with Ramana Maharishi, and philosopher Jiddu Krishnamurti, among others). She also became a close collaborator of Mahatma Gandhi supporting Indian movements for independence, and also received the name "Umadevi" from him.

In 1944, together with another Polish Hindu Maurice Frydman, she founded the Indo-Polish Library in Madras, which became for more than thirty years a major editorial body for Polish translations of main Hindu religious texts (e.g. Bhagavat Gita, Mahabharata, Ramayana) as well as for contemporary Indian poetry and literature.

Dynowska translated from Polish to English, Tamil, and Hindi most important works of Polish poets, and published these works in India. She was an exceptionally active promoter of Polish culture and history in India. Post Indian independence, she took Indian citizenship.

From 1960, she started helping Tibetan refugees in India. Living in their main centre in Dharmasala, Dynowska organized schools, education, and social infrastructure there. Additionally, she published Polish translations of Buddhist texts. She was also referred to as "Tenzin Chodon" by the Tibetans as she helped them settle down after they fled from China in 1959.

She died in Mysore, and according to her will, her burial had an inter-religious (Catholic-Buddhist-Hindu) character.
