= Nisargadatta Maharaj =

Indian guru (1897–1981)

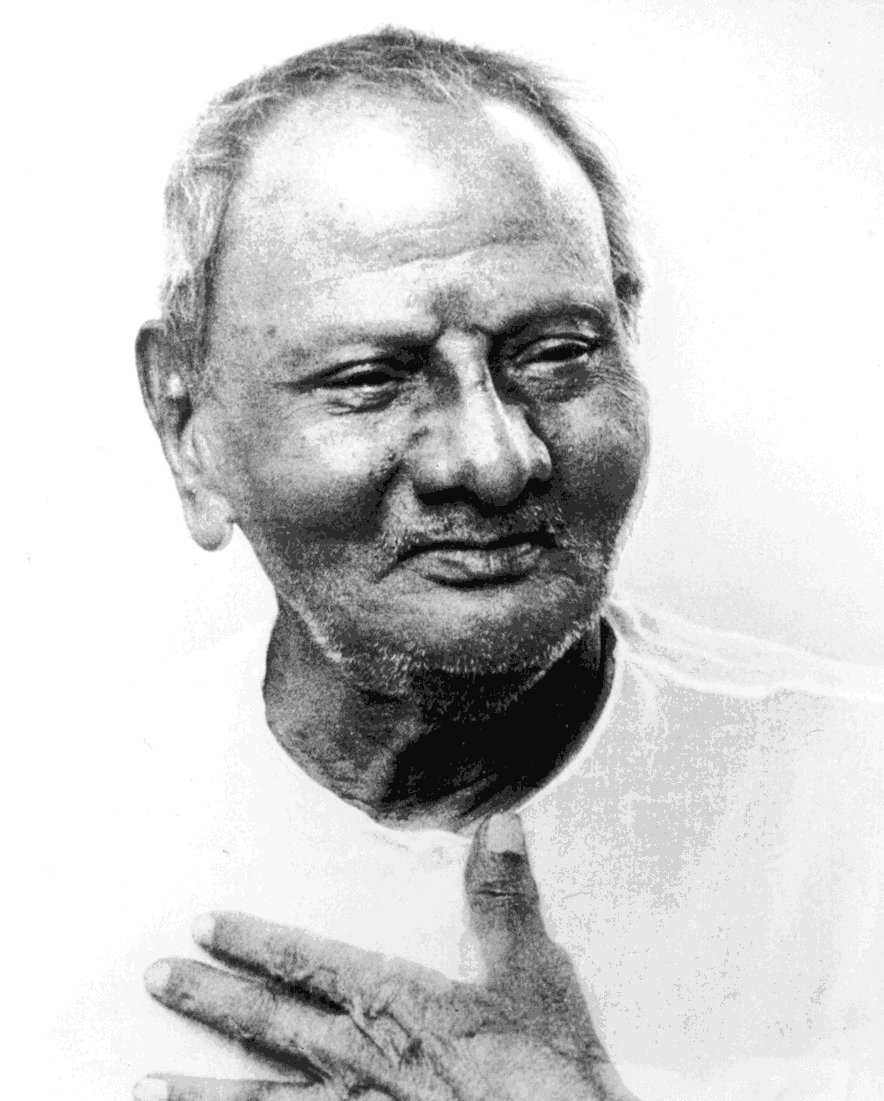

Personal life
- Born: Maruti Shivrampant Kambli; 17 April 1897 Bombay, Bombay Presidency, British India
- Died: 8 September 1981 (aged 84) Mumbai, India

Religious life
- Religion: Hinduism
- Order: Inchegeri Sampradaya
- Philosophy: Nisarga Yoga

Religious career
- Teacher: Siddharameshwar Maharaj

Quotation

Establish yourself firmly in the awareness of 'I AM'. This is the beginning, and also the end of all endeavour.

Nisargadatta Maharaj (pronounced [nisəɾgəd̪ɑːt̪t̪ə məɦaːɾaːd͡ʒ]; (born Maruti Shivrampant Kambli; 17 April 1897 – 8 September 1981) was an Indian guru of nonduality, belonging to the Inchagiri Sampradaya, a lineage of teachers from the Navnath Sampradaya.

The publication in 1973 of I Am That, an English translation of his talks in Marathi by Maurice Frydman, brought him worldwide recognition and followers, especially from North America and Europe.

== Biography ==
=== Early life ===
Nisargadatta (Note: Nisarga: "primordial", "inborn", "innate", "natural state or condition or form or character". Gaitonde translates nisarga as "nature", as in: "All these names like Shiva, Ram and Krishna are the names of nature (Nisarga) personified." Datta means 'to give'; "Given, presented, made over" (Marathi-English dictionary), "Given, given away, presented"(Sanskrit Dcitionary), "'granting' (great joy)" (General definition (in Jainism))) was born on 17 April 1897 to Shivrampant Kambli and Parvati bai, in Bombay. (Note: Biography of Nisargadatta Maharaj) The day was also Hanuman Jayanti, the birthday of Hanuman, hence the boy was named 'Maruti', after him. (Note: Samarth Ramdas (17th century), the author of the Dasbodh, an important scripture in the Inchegeri Sampradaya, was a devotee of Hanuman.) His parents were followers of the Varkari sampradaya, (Note: Timothy Conway, Sri Nisargadatta Maharaj (1897-1981), Life & Teachings of Bombay's Fiery Sage of Liberating Wisdom, enlightened-spirituality.org) Vaishnavite bhakti tradition which worships Vithoba. His father, Shivrampant, worked as a domestic servant in Mumbai and later became a petty farmer in Kandalgaon.

Maruti Shivrampant Kambli was brought up in Kandalgaon, a small village in the Sindhudurga district of Maharashtra, with his two brothers, four sisters and deeply religious parents. (Note: Detailed Biography) In 1915, after his father died, he moved to Bombay to support his family back home, following his elder brother. Initially he worked as a junior clerk at an office but quickly he opened a small goods store, mainly selling beedis (leaf-rolled cigarettes) and soon owned a string of eight retail shops. (Note: Sri Nisagdatta bio at advait.org) In 1924 he married Sumatibai and they had three daughters and a son.

=== Sadhana ===
Nisargadatta Maharaj met his guru Siddharameshwar Maharaj in 1933.

In 1933, he was introduced to his guru, Siddharameshwar Maharaj, the head of the Inchegiri branch of the Navnath Sampradaya, by his friend Yashwantrao Baagkar. His guru told him, "You are not what you take yourself to be...". (Note: Sri Nisargdatta Quote) Siddharameshwar initiated him into the Inchegiri Sampradaya, giving him meditation-instruction and a mantra, which he immediately began to recite. Siddharameshwar gave Nisargadatta instructions for self-enquiry which he followed verbatim, as he himself recounted later:

My Guru ordered me to attend to the sense 'I am' and to give attention to nothing else. I just obeyed. I did not follow any particular course of breathing, or meditation, or study of scriptures. Whatever happened, I would turn away my attention from it and remain with the sense 'I am'. It may look too simple, even crude. My only reason for doing it was that my Guru told me so. Yet it worked!

Following his guru's instructions to concentrate on the feeling "I Am", he used all his spare time looking at himself in silence, and remained in that state for the coming years, practicing meditation and singing devotional Bhajans: (Note: Guru's teachings)

My Guru told me: "...Go back to that state of pure being, where the 'I am' is still in its purity before it got contaminated with 'this I am' or 'that I am.' Your burden is of false self-identifications—abandon them all." My guru told me, "Trust me, I tell you: you are Divine. Take it as the absolute truth. Your joy is divine, your suffering is divine too. All comes from God. Remember it always. You are God, your will alone is done." I did believe him and soon realized how wonderfully true and accurate were his words. I did not condition my mind by thinking, "I am God, I am wonderful, I am beyond." I simply followed his instruction, which was to focus the mind on pure being, "I am," and stay in it. I used to sit for hours together, with nothing but the "I am" in my mind and soon the peace and joy and deep all-embracing love became my normal state. In it all disappeared—myself, my guru, the life I lived, the world around me. Only peace remained, and unfathomable silence. (I Am That, Dialogue 51, April 16, 1971).

After an association that lasted hardly two and a half years, Siddharameshwar Maharaj died on 9 November 1936. In 1937, Maharaj left Mumbai and travelled across India. (Note: Sri Nisargdatta bio in innerquest.org) After eight months he returned to his family in Mumbai in 1938. On the journey home his state of mind changed, realizing that "nothing was wrong anymore." He spent the rest of his life in Mumbai, maintaining one shop to earn an income.

=== Later years ===
In 1942 his wife Sumatibai died, followed by the death of his daughter in 1948. He started to give initiations in 1951, after a personal revelation from his guru, Siddharameshwar Maharaj.

After he retired from his shop in 1966, Nisargadatta Maharaj continued to receive and teach visitors in his home, giving discourses twice a day. The publication of I Am That (1973) brought him international fame, 'disturbing my quiet life' and changing his home into a "railway station platform." He died on 8 September 1981 at the age of 84, of throat cancer. (Note: It Is Not Real)

== Teachings ==
Nisargadatta gave talks and answered questions at his humble flat in Khetwadi, Mumbai, where a mezzanine room was created for him to receive disciples and visitors. This room was also used for daily chantings, bhajans (devotional songs), meditation sessions, and discourses. While known in the West for his non-dual teachings, he offered a combination of devotion to the Guru, mantra-japa to invoke the Divine and still and purify the mind, and atma-vichara (self-inquiry) to recognize and abide in the formless self. Boucher notes that Nisargadatta adopted a different mode of instruction, through questions and answers, for his western disciples. Many of Nisargadatta Maharaj's talks were recorded, and formed the basis of I Am That as well as of the several other books attributed to him.

=== Awareness of true nature ===
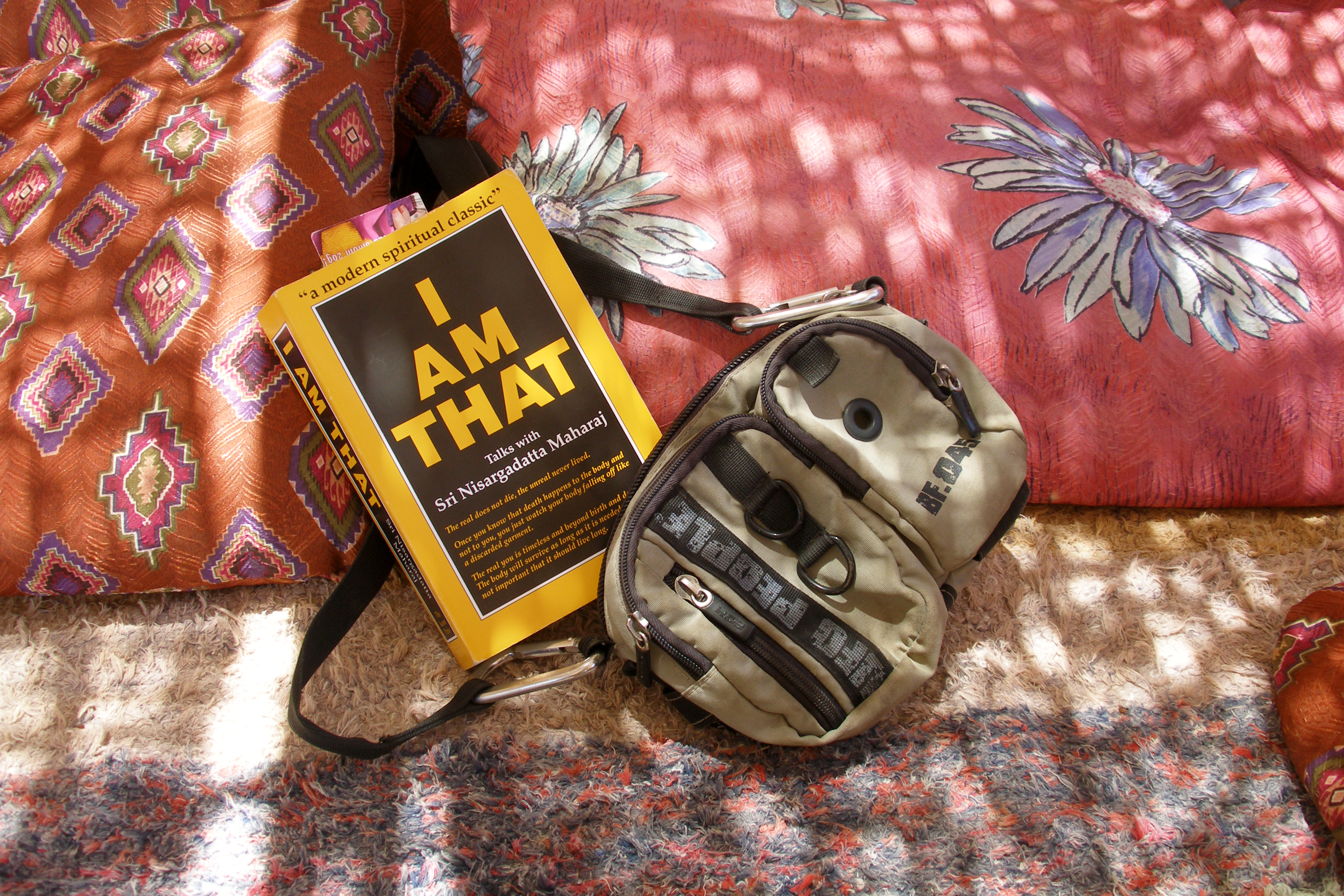
Nisargadatta's "I Am That" in English.

According to Timothy Conway, Nisargadatta's only subject was

...our real Identity as the birthless-deathless, infinite-eternal Absolute Awareness or Parabrahman, and Its play of emanated universal consciousness. For Maharaj, our only "problem" (an imagined one!) is a case of mistaken identity: we presume to be an individual, and, originally and fundamentally, we are not an individual, we are intrinsically always and only the Absolute.

Nisargadatta explains:

The life force [prana] and the mind are operating [of their own accord], but the mind will tempt you to believe that it is "you". Therefore understand always that you are the timeless spaceless witness. And even if the mind tells you that you are the one who is acting, don't believe the mind. [...] The apparatus [mind, body] which is functioning has come upon your original essence, but you are not that apparatus.

In Consciousness and the Absolute, Nisargadatta Maharaj further explains:

In the consciousness hierarchy there are three stages:

1. Jivatman is the one who identifies himself with the body-mind. One who thinks I am a body, a personality, an individual apart from the world. He excludes and isolates himself from the world as a separate personality because of identification with the body and the mind.

2. Next only the beingness, or the consciousness, which is the world. "I Am" means my whole world. Just being and the world. Together with the beingness the world is also felt - that is Atman.

3. The Ultimate principle that knows this beingness cannot be termed at all. It cannot be approached or conditioned by any words. That is the Ultimate state.

The hierarchy I explain in common words, like: I have a grandson (that is jivatma). I have a son and I am the grandfather. Grandfather is the source of the son and grandson.

The three stages cannot be termed as knowledge. The term knowledge comes at beingness level. I have passed on to you the essence of my teachings.

According to Conway, awareness of the Absolute could be regained by

... a radical disidentification from the dream of "me and my world" via intensely meditative self-inquiry (atma-vicara) and supreme Wisdom-Knowledge (vijñana or jñana). "I know only Atma-yoga, which is 'Self-Knowledge,' and nothing else.... My process is Atma-yoga, which means abidance in the Self."

=== Naam-mantra and devotion ===
Nisargadatta was critical of a merely intellectual approach to nondual Truth. He had a strong devotional zeal towards his own guru, and suggested the path of devotion, Bhakti yoga, to some of his visitors, as he believed the path of knowledge, Jnana yoga was not the only approach to Truth. Nisargadatta also emphasized love of Guru and God, and the practice of mantra repetition and singing bhajans, devotional songs. He tailored his instructions to the needs and disposition of each visitor, emphasizing that jnana is a difficult approach, and that mantra and devotion also serve to develop faith in a higher power, and purity of mind and concentration. (Note: Nisargadatta himself said to a visitor: "I may talk Non-duality to some of the people who come here. That is not for you and you should not pay any attention to what I am telling others. The book of my conversations [I Am That] should not be taken as the last word on my teachings. I had given some answers to questions of certain individuals. Those answers were intended for those people and not for all. Instruction can be on an individual basis only. The same medicine cannot be prescribed for all. Nowadays people are full of intellectual conceit. They have no faith in the ancient traditional practices leading up to Self-Knowledge. They want everything served to them on a platter. The path of Knowledge makes sense to them and because of that they may want to practice it. They will then find that it requires more concentration than they can muster and, slowly becoming humble, they will finally take up easier practices like repetition of a mantra or worship of a form. Slowly the belief in a Power greater than themselves will dawn on them and a taste for devotion will sprout in their heart. Then only will it be possible for them to attain purity of mind and concentration.) (Note: With the Bird's Way, first one's mind must be made subtle. This is generally done with some initial meditation on a mantra or phrase which helps the aspirant to step beyond the mental/conceptual body, using a concept to go beyond conceptualization. (Note: sadguru.us, The Bird's way Archived 2015-03-30 at the Wayback Machine))

Cathy Boucher notes that the Inchagiri Sampradaya emphasized mantra meditation from its inception in the early 19th century, but that the emphasis shifted toward a form of Self-enquiry with Sri Siddharameshwar. Nevertheless,

Sri Nisargadatta Maharaj [...] still gave mantra initiation, with the underlying point being that the mantra was more than sound, it was the Absolute Itself which could be reverberated throughout life in all circumstance.

Nisargadatta, and other gurus of the Incegeri sampradaya used naam mantras, also called Guru mantras, mantras consisting of the name of a deity, which is chanted repetitiously. The mantra is not to be disclosed to others, lest its effectiveness will diminish. examples are "I am Brahman", "Hari Om," and "Soham-Hamsa" ("That am I"). (Note: ramakantmaharajdakshina.net, Naam mantra) (Note: See also Nisargadatta Maharaj speaking of importance of Naam Mantra Meditation, and Maharaj Speaking on the Naam Mantra.)

=== Scriptures ===
According to Timothy Conway, Nisargadatta often read Marathi scriptures: Nath saint Jnanesvar's Amrutanubhav and Jnanesvari (Gita Commentary); Varkari Sants, namely Eknatha's Bhagavat (Eknathi Bhagavata, a rewrite of the Bhagavad Purana), Ramdas' Dasbodha, and Tukaram's poems; but also the Yoga Vasistha, Adi Shankara's treatises, and some major Upanishads.

=== Nisarga Yoga ===
Nisargadatta taught what has been called Nisarga Yoga. In I Am That, Nisarga Yoga is defined as living life with "harmlessness," "friendliness," and "interest," abiding in "spontaneous awareness" while being "conscious of effortless living." The practice of this form of Yoga involves meditating on one's sense of "I am", "being" or "consciousness" with the aim of reaching its ultimate source prior to this sense, which Nisargadatta called the "Self".

The second edition of I Am That includes an epilogue titled Nisarga Yoga by Maurice Frydman which includes this passage:

"This dwelling on the sense 'I am' is the simple, easy and natural Yoga, the Nisarga Yoga. There is no secrecy in it and no dependence; no preparation is required and no initiation. Whoever is puzzled by his very existence as a conscious being and earnestly wants to find his own source, can grasp the ever-present sense of 'I am' and dwell on it assiduously and patiently, till the clouds obscuring the mind dissolve and the heart of being is seen in all its glory."

Nisargadatta did not prescribe a specific practice for self-knowledge but advised his disciples, "Don't pretend to be what you are not, don't refuse to be what you are." By means of self-enquiry, he advised, "Why don't you enquire how real are the world and the person?". Nisargadatta frequently spoke about the importance of having the "inner conviction" about one's true nature and without such Self-knowledge one would continue to suffer. Nisargadatta claimed that the names of the Hindu deities Shiva, Rama and Krishna were the names of nature (Nisarga) personified, and that all of life arises from the same non-dual source or Self. Remembrance of this source was the core of Nisargadatta's message:

'You are not your body, but you are the consciousness in the body, because of which you have the awareness of 'I am'. It is without words, just pure beingness. It has become soul of the world. In the absence of your consciousness, the world will not be experienced. Hence, you are the consciousness… remember what you have heard… meditate on it. Meditation means you have to hold consciousness by itself. The consciousness should give attention to itself. This consciousness is Ishwara. As there is no God other than this consciousness, worship it.' 'The knowledge "I am" is God. It is Ishwara, as well as maya. Maya is God's power. All the names of God are of this consciousness only in different forms. Remember the fact "I am not the body" and get firmly established. That is the sign of a true seeker.'

== Lineage ==
=== Disciples ===
Among his best known disciples are Maurice Frydman, Sailor Bob Adamson, Stephen Howard Wolinsky (born 31 January 1950), Jean Dunn, Alexander Smit (Sri Parabrahmadatta Maharaj) (1948-1998), Douwe Tiemersma (7 January 1945 – 3 January 2013), Robert Powell, Timothy Conway, Wayne Dyer and Ramesh Balsekar (1917-2009). A less well known disciple is Sri Ramakant Maharaj (born 8 July 1941), who received the naam mantra from Nisargadatta in 1962, spent the next 19 years with the master. (Note: Interview with Ramakant maharaj) (Note: Shri Ramakant Maharaj) and claims to be "the only Indian direct disciple of Shri Nisargadatta Maharaj" who offers initiation into this lineage. (Note: Shri Ramakant Maharaj, Information) Sachin Kshirsagar, who has published a series of books on Nisargadatta in the Marathi language (Note: Marathi books) and also re-published Master of Self Realization, says to have received the Naam (Mantra) in a dream from Shree Nisargadatta Maharaj on 17 Oct., 2011.

=== Successors ===
David Godman gives the following account of an explanation by Nisargadatta of the succession of Gurus in the Inchagiri Sampradaya:

I sit here every day answering your questions, but this is not the way that the teachers of my lineage used to do their work. A few hundred years ago there were no questions and answers at all. Ours is a householder lineage, which means everyone had to go out and earn his living. There were no meetings like this where disciples met in large numbers with the Guru and asked him questions. Travel was difficult. There were no buses, trains and planes. In the old days the Guru did the traveling on foot, while the disciples stayed at home and looked after their families. The Guru walked from village to village to meet the disciples. If he met someone he thought was ready to be included in the sampradaya, he would initiate him with mantra of the lineage. That was the only teaching given out. The disciple would repeat the mantra and periodically the Guru would come to the village to see what progress was being made. When the Guru knew that he was about to pass away, he would appoint one of the householder-devotees to be the new Guru, and that new Guru would then take on the teaching duties: walking from village to village, initiating new devotees and supervising the progress of the old ones. (Note: David Godman, Remembering Nisargadatta Maharaj)

According to David Godman, Nisargadatta was not allowed by Siddharameshwar to appoint a successor, because he "wasn't realised himself when Siddharameshwar passed away." Nisargadatta started to initiate others in 1951, after receiving an inner revelation from Siddharameshwar. Nisargadatta himself explains:

The Navnath Sampradaya is only a tradition, way of teaching and practice. It does not denote a level of consciousness. If you accept a Navnath Sampradaya teacher as your Guru, you join his Sampradaya. Usually you receive a token of his grace - a look, a touch, or a word, sometimes a vivid dream or a strong remembrance.

== Works ==
- Self Knowledge & Self Realisation, Bombay: Ram Narayan Chavhan, 1963
- I Am That (ed. Maurice Frydman), Bombay: Chetana, 1973, ISBN 9788185300450
- Pointers from Nisargadatta Maharaj (ed. Ramesh S. Balsekar), Bombay: Chetana, 1982, ISBN 978-0893860042
- Seeds of Consciousness (ed. Jean Dunn), NC: Acorn Press, 1982, ISBN 978-0893860257
- Prior to Consciousness (ed. Jean Dunn), New York: Grove Press, 1985, ISBN 978-8185300351
- The Nectar of the Lord's Feet (ed. Robert Powell), Longmead en Shaftesbury (Dorset): Element Books, 1987, ISBN 978-1852300111 republished as The Nectar of Immortality, San Diego: Blue Dove Press, 2001, ISBN 978-1884997136
- The Ultimate Medicine (ed. Robert Powell), San Diego: Blue Dove Press, 1994, ISBN 978-1556436338
- Consciousness and the Absolute (ed. Jean Dunn), Durham: Acorn Press, 1994, ISBN 978-0893860417
- The Experience of Nothingness (ed. Robert Powell), San Diego: Blue Dove Press, 1996, ISBN 978-1884997143
- Gleanings from Nisargadatta (ed. Mark West), Beyond Description Publishing, 2006
- Beyond Freedom (ed. Maria Jory), Mumbai: Yogi Impressions, 2007, ISBN 978-8188479283
- I Am Unborn (ed. Damodar Lund and Pradeep Apte), 2007
- The Nisargadatta Gita (ed. Pradeep Apte), 2008, ISBN 978-0984776764
- Meditations with Sri Nisargadatta Maharaj (ed. Dinkar Kshirsagar and Suresh N. Mehta), Mumbai: Yogi Impressions, 2014, ISBN 978-9382742197
- Nothing is Everything (ed. Mohan Gaitonde), Mumbai: Zen Publications, 2014, ISBN 978-9382788973
- Self-Love (ed. Dinkar Kshirsagar), Mumbai: Zen Publications, 2017, ISBN 978-0984776764
- The Earliest Discourses: Meditations from 1954-1956 (ed. Shankarrao B. Daygude and Dinkar Kshirsagar), Mumbai: Zen Publications, 2020, ISBN 978-9387242388

== See also ==
- Maurice Frydman
- Ramana Maharshi
- Ramesh Balsekar
- Samarth Ramdas

== Sources ==
Printed sources

- Boucher, Cathy (n.d.), The Lineage of Nine Gurus. The Navnath Sampradaya and Sri Nisargadatta Maharaj
- Dyer, Wayne (2007), Change Your Thoughts – Change Your Life, Hay House, Inc, ISBN 978-1-4019-2052-4
- Frydman, Maurice (1987), Navanath Sampradaya. In: I Am That. Sri Nisargadatta Maharaj, Bombay: Chetana
- Gaitonde, Mohan (2014). Nothing Is Everything The Quintessential Teachings of Sri Nisargadatta Maharaj. Zen Pubns. ISBN 9789382788973. OCLC 884814258.
- Jones, Constance; Ryan, James D. (2006), Encyclopedia of Hinduism, Infobase Publishing, ISBN 978-0-8160-7564-5
- Nisargadatta (1973), I Am That (PDF), archived from the original (PDF) on 27 January 2018
- Nisargadatta (2012) [1973]. I am that : talks with Sri Nisargadatta Maharaj. Maurice Frydman, Sudhakar S. Dikshit (2nd American ed.). Durham, N.C.: Acorn Press. ISBN 9780893860462. OCLC 811788655.
- Rosner, Neal (Swami Paramatmananda) (1987), On the Road to Freedom: A Pilgrimage in India, Vol. 1, San Ramon, CA: Mata Amritanandamayi Center

Web sources
