= Ramesh Balsekar =

Indian guru (1917–2009)

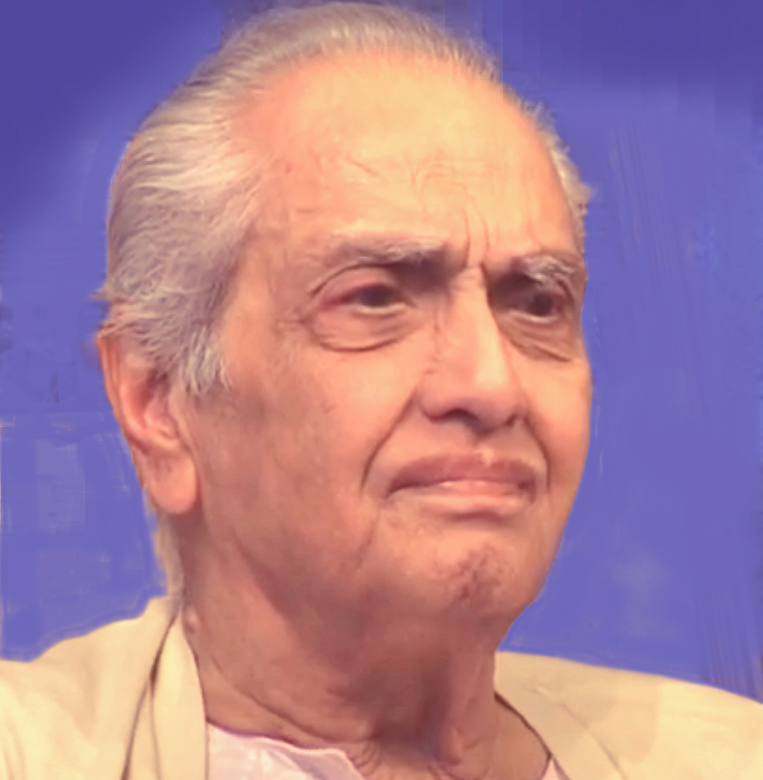
- Ramesh Balsekar in 1999
- Born: 25 May 1917; Mumbai
- Died: 27 September 2009 (aged 92); Mumbai
- Occupation: Advaita teacher

Ramesh S. Balsekar (25 May 1917 – 27 September 2009) was an Indian Advaita teacher and physical culturist. He was disciple and principal translator of Nisargadatta Maharaj, a renowned Advaita master. From early childhood, Balsekar was drawn to Advaita, a nondual teaching, particularly the teachings of Ramana Maharshi and Wei Wu Wei. He wrote more than 20 books, was president of the Bank of India, and received guests daily in his home in Mumbai until shortly before his death in 2009.

== Career ==
As a young man, Balsekar was interested in bodybuilding, physical culture and yoga. He was a student of K. V. Iyer. Balsekar was featured with photographic coverage in the physical culture magazine Strength & Health and others. His 1940 book Streamlines included yoga-āsana and sūrya namaskāra exercises. He married Sharda in 1940, they had several children.

He won the "All-India Body Beautiful Competition" in 1938 and studied physical culture in England under Lawrence A. Woodford, author of Physical Idealism and the Art of Posing. He was described in physical culture literature as a "most perfectly developed man". In 1936, Balsekar studied at London School of Economics for several years. After returning to Mumbai he became a clerk at the Bank of India. He was promoted throughout his career, culminating to the highest position of the president of the Bank of India, which he held for ten years until his retirement in 1977. He became a teacher of Advaita philosophy.

== Teachings ==
Balsekar taught from the tradition of Advaita Vedanta nondualism. His teaching begins with the idea of an ultimate Source, Brahman, from which creation arises. Once creation has arisen, the world and life operate mechanistically according to both Divine and natural laws. While people believe that they are actually doing things and making choices, free will is in fact an illusion. All that happens is predetermined (“ God’s Will Be Done” ) as in a film. The Source had written the script, directs it and plays all the parts and props. “There is nothing second to the Source”. Every human is a three dimensional object through which the Source or consciousness acts to bring about outcomes so that what has to happen can happen. There is no individual doer of any actions, but each individual body mind organism acts and is driven by its genetic makeup and conditioning both of which are not in control of the individual. Ramesh often quoted the Buddha ....”Events happen, deeds are done but there is no individual doer thereof”. The manifestation came about when potential energy activated itself. If it was not potential energy, then it would have dead energy and unable to activate its potential. This activation is what modern scientists call the Big Bang.

Like other Vedanta teachers, Balsekar says that while creation and creator appear to be different and separate, that they are actually two sides of the same coin. He taught that life is a happening but there is no individual doer of life. Among his most notable students are Dorje Khandro, a former disciple of Chögyam Trungpa, Gautam Sachdeva and Roger Castillo.

In his 80s, Balsekar lived in a sea-facing apartment where he gave question-and-answer sessions. Celebrities such as Leonard Cohen, Dennis Quaid and Meg Ryan attended these sessions.

== Selected publications ==
- Streamlines (1940), Bombay: G. C. Dorsett
- Duet of One: The Ashtavakra Gita Dialogue (1989), ISBN 0-929448-11-1
- Consciousness Speaks: Conversations with Ramesh S. Balsekar (1993), ISBN 0-929448-14-6
- Who Cares?! The Unique Teaching of Ramesh S. Balsekar (1999), ISBN 0-929448-18-9
- The Ultimate Understanding (2002), ISBN 1-84293-045-1
- Confusion No More (2007), ISBN 978-1-905857-25-8

== See also ==
- Nondualism
