= Yamai Temple =

Yamai Devi
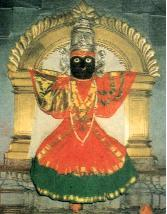

Religion
- Affiliation: Hinduism

Location
- Interactive map of Yamai Devi

The Yamai Devi Temple is situated in a hill complex in the town of Aundh, Satara district, Maharashtra, India.

== History ==
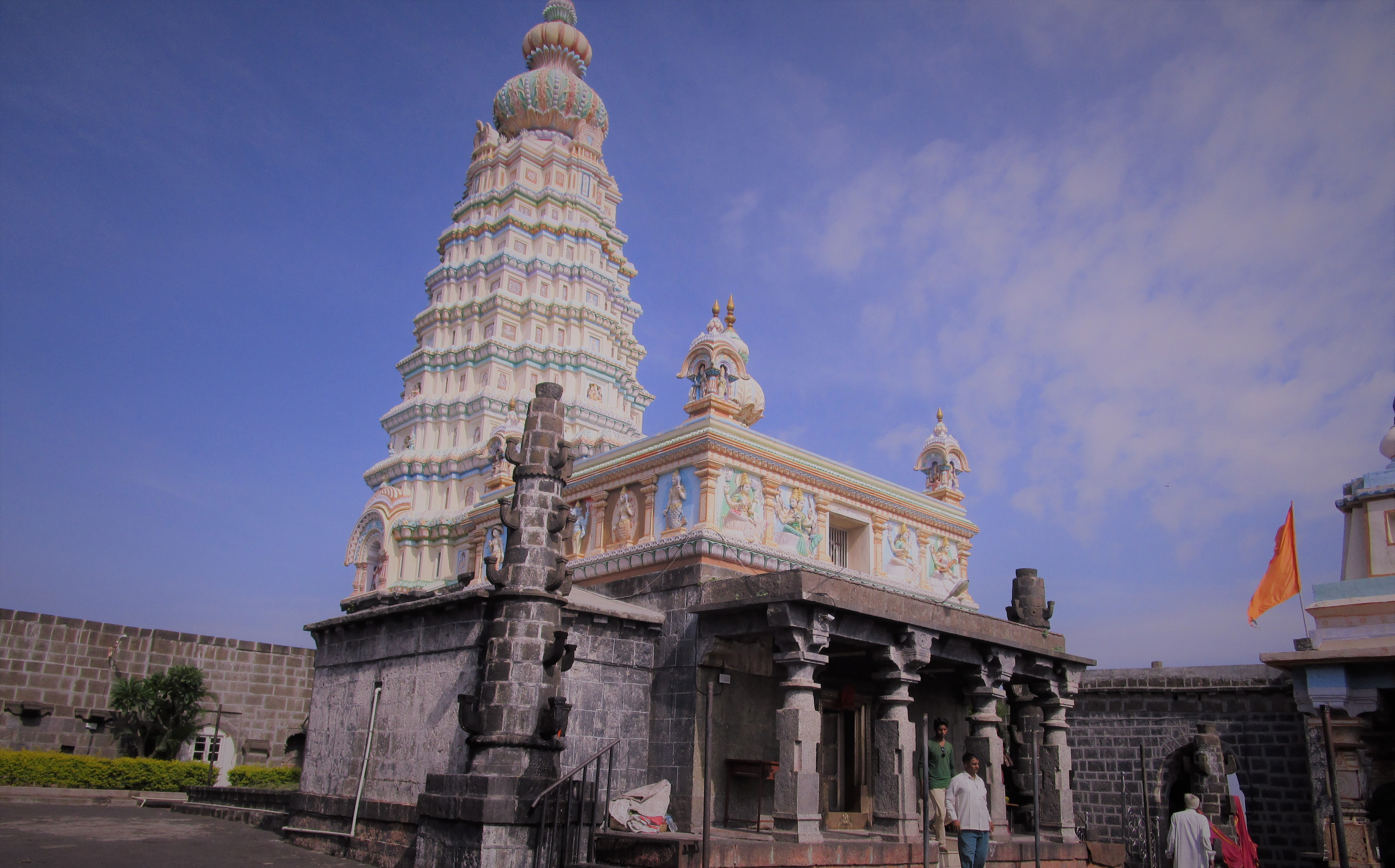
Yamai temple on the hill

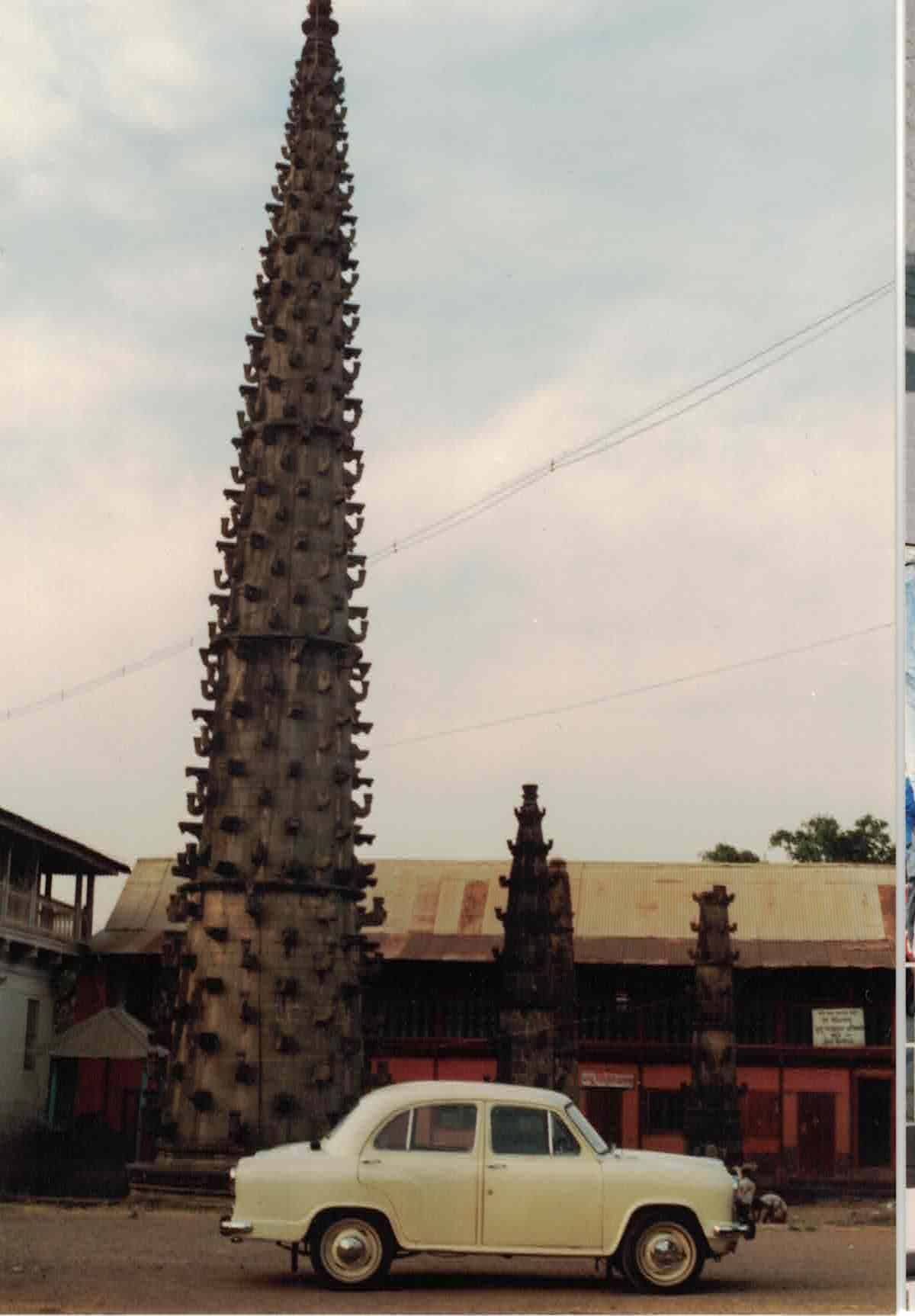
The Pride of Aundh: Standing 71 feet tall, this is not just the highest Deepmala/Deepstambh in Maharashtra, but the tallest in all of India.

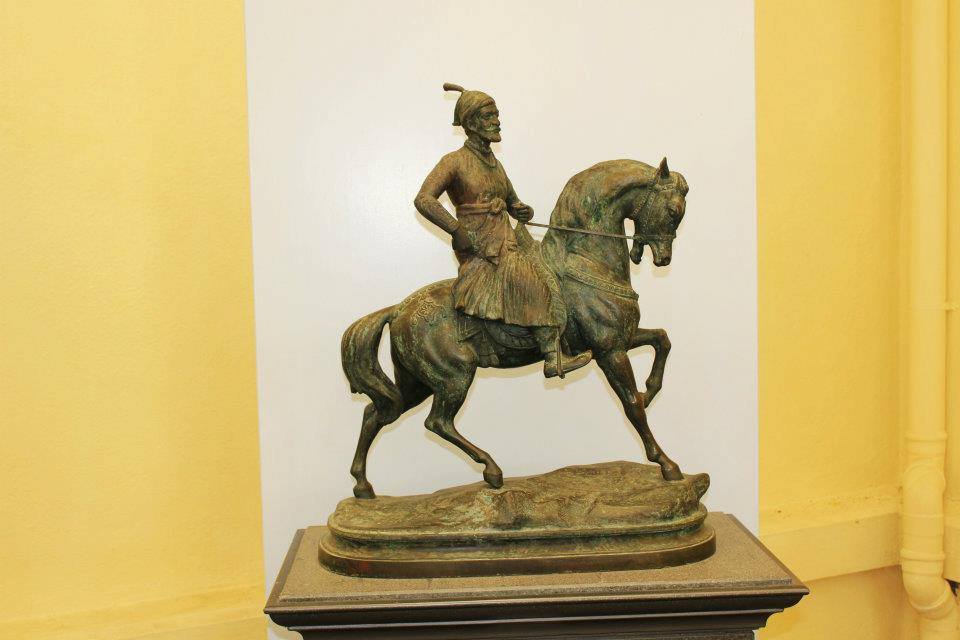
Bronze statue of Shivaji Maharaj in the collection of the Shri Bhavani Museum of Aundh

It is said that Goddess Mahalaxmi, God Jyotiba of Kolhapur and Sri Rama (Lord Vishnu) called her as "Ye Mai" (in Marathi) (ये माय / ये माई) which means "Mother, pls. come" in English. Hence, she is known as Yamai Devi. Yamai Devi is also considered the elder sister of Tulja Bhavani because Yamai is regarded as a combined manifestation of Shiva and Parvati and is also considered a joint incarnation of Parvati and Renuka Devi. Since the incarnation of Renuka is associated with the Krita Yuga and that of Tuljabhavani with the Treta Yuga, Yamai is therefore regarded as the elder sister of Tuljabhavani. Significantly, within the Tuljapur Tuljabhavani temple complex, there is also a consecrated shrine dedicated to Yamai Devi. Therefore, many devotees still follow the tradition of visiting the Mulpeeth Yamai Devi after visiting Tuljapur's Tulja Bhavani. Devotees are used to come with pure heart into one of the Devi Yamai's temples and to find her blessing.

== Temple features ==
The temple is the family shrine (kula-daiwat) for a large number of Marathi families. The top of the temple has images and idols of various Hindu deities. The town and the temple has been associated with the PantPratinidhi family for many centuries. The temple had an elephant for religious processions and ceremonies for more than fifty years. It was taken to an elephant sanctuary in 2017 because of health issues.

== Shri Bhavani Museum ==
The temple complex also houses the Shri Bhavani Museum established from the private collection of the Maharajas of Aundh. The museum building is situated on the middle section of the temple hill. Visitors can reach the museum, both by steps and road. The museum holds paintings by noted 19th and 20th century Indian artists such as M. V. Dhurandhar, Baburao Painter, Madhav Satwalekar and Raja Ravi Varma as well as the famous Mother and Child stone structure by the British artist Henry Moore.
