= Shankar Puntambekar =

Indian writer

Shankar Punatambekar (1923 – 2016) was a writer in Hindi language. He is known as a satirist. His literary output includes short stories, novels, one-act plays, based on satire and reviews.

== Literary career ==
He brought a different kind of satirical novel in Hindi.Two of his popular novels include, Ek Mantri Swarglok Main (translation:a minister in heaven) and Janha devta marte hai (translation:Where gods die). Puntambekar also wrote Vyangakosh (dictionary of satire) in Hindi. The book includes 9500 words in Hindi with Puntambekar's own satirical meaning for each word.

== Awards ==
Punatambekar was honored with awards such as 'Vyangyashree', 'Chakallas' and 'Muktibodh'.
