= Madhav Satwalekar =

Indian artist

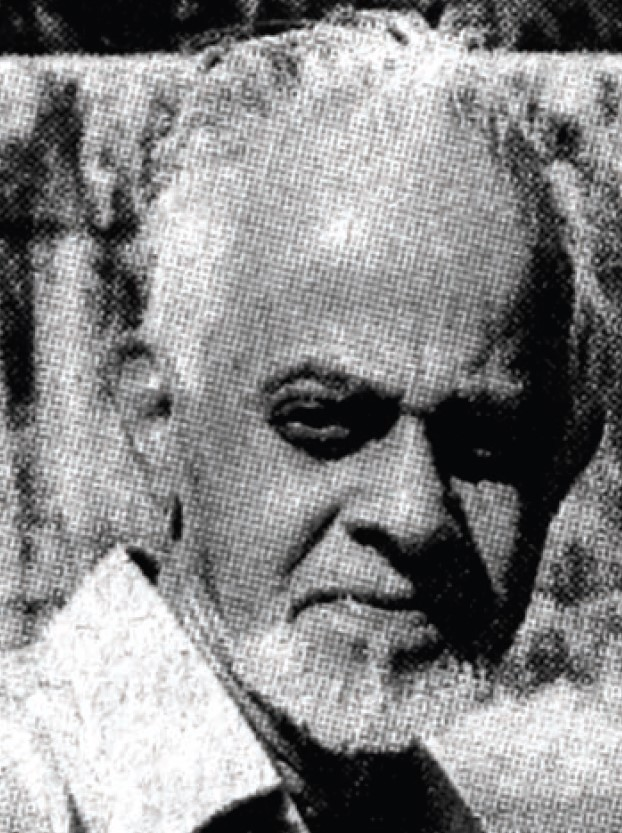
- Born: 13 August 1915; Lahore, British India
- Died: 2006 (aged 90–91)
- Known for: Painting

Madhav Satwalekar (13 August 1915 – 2006) was an Indian artist who achieved recognition for his depiction of scenes from contemporary life and landscape paintings.

== Early life ==
Madhav Satwalekar was born in a Maharashtrian Karhade Brahmin family on 13 August 1915 in the city of Lahore in present-day Pakistan. His father, Shripad Damodar Satwalekar, was a turn-of-the-century painter and Vedic scholar who had a studio in Lahore at that time. Satwalekar spent most of his childhood in the Princely state of Aundh where his father was the resident scholar, artist and advisor in the court of the then Maharaja.

== Career as an artist ==
Satwalekar first studied at Sir J.J. School of Art in Bombaybefore going to Europe from 1937 to 1940 to study at Accademia di Belle Arti Firenze in Italy, Slade School in London, and Land Académie de la Grande Chaumière in Paris. He was the recipient of the Mayo Medal, the highest award of the Sir J. J. School of Art in 1935.

Satwalekar’s work included landscape paintings, Indian mythological subjects, and depictions of everyday life. He used both oil and watercolor mediums.

Exhibition of Satwalekar's work was first held in 1945, at the Taj Hotel in Mumbai. Over the years, apart from India, exhibitions of his work have been held in many parts of the world including the British East Africa in 1949, in countries of Europe, and the Middle East.

Later in his career during the 1970s and 1980s, Satwalekar served as the Director of Art for the Indian State of Maharashtra. He also co-founded the Indian Art Institute for spreading awareness of art.
