= Parashuramrao Shrinivas I =

Pant Pratinidhi of Aundh from 1777 to 1848

Pant Pratinidhi of Aundh
- Reign: 30 August 1777 – 11 June 1848
- Coronation: 12 September 1777
- Predecessor: Bhagwant Rao
- Successor: Shrinivasrao Parashuram
- Born: 30 August 1777; Aundh State
- Died: 11 June 1848 (aged 70); Aundh State
- Burial: 1848
- Spouse: 2
- Issue: Shrinivasrao Parashuram (adopted)
- House: Royal family of Aundh
- Father: Bhagwant Rao
- Mother: Rani of Aundh State
- Religion: Hinduism

Parashuramrao Shrinivas I (30 August 1777 – 11 June 1848) was the hereditary ruler of Aundh State from his birth in 1777 until his death in 1848.

== Life ==
Parashuramrao's father died the day he was born, enthroning him at birth. Parashuramrao (alias Thotepant) created riots with the help of Ramoshis kept by him in his service.

At only twelve days old, Parshuram Shrinivas (Thote Pant), became a Pratinidhi. His mother thought that he was an inauspicious child, having 'killed' his father, though he was actually born a day after the death. She shunned and neglected him. Even as a child, Thote Pant was strong-willed.

Parashuramrao created tumult in the Peshwa region between the Warana and Neera. In a battle between Bapu Gokhale and Parashuramrao in March 1806, Parashuramrao was seriously injured and taken prisoner by the Peshwas. Parashuramrao Shrinivas, known as a valiant soldier and oppressive ruler, was accused of mismanaging the state.

Later Parashuramrao was released from prison and resumed authority over his state.

After the fall of Peshwa rule, the British East India company entered separate treaties in 1820 with the Jagirdars who were nominally subordinate to the Raja of Satara. He adopted the title of Pant in 1846, on which occasion he paid tribute to the Raja of Satara and married two wives, from whom he later separated.

He had no son and therefore, adopted a child of one of his relatives in 1843, who became Shrinivasrao Parshuram (1833–1901). Shrinivasrao Parshuram succeeded him and was considered an erudite and well-loved ruler. His son introduced primary and secondary schools in his state, and was himself a Councillor in the Legislative Assembly of Bombay.

Parashuramrao died in 1848 and was succeeded by his adopted son Shrinivasrao Parashuram .
