= Surve =

Flag of Marathas

Surve (सुर्वे) is a Maratha clan from Maharashtra, India.

== History ==
A family belonging to the Surve clan held the jagir of Shringarpur. According to their lore, In the 14th century, they came to Deogiri, where he served the Yadava dynasty. Later, he changed his alliance to the Bahmani Sultanate, and was given the Shringarpur jagir. He was also given the title "Shurvir", which later got corrupted to "Surve".

== People with surname Surve include ==
- Narayan Gangaram Surve, Marathi-language poet
- Harsh Surve, Shiv Sena politician
- Shivani Surve, television actress in Hindi and Marathi TV serials
- Manohar Arjun "Manya" Surve, Indian criminal
