= Aundh, Satara =

Town in Satara, Maharashtra, India

Coordinates: 17°32′45″N 74°22′30″E

Aundh is a town in India 26 mi. southeast of Satara. The population in 2011 was about 3500. It was part of the Aundh State, a princely state (1699–1947). It is part of Satara District in Maharashtra State.

== See also ==
- Aundh Experiment
- Shree Mulpeeth Yamai Devi Temple
