= Kenneth A. Ballhatchet =

British historian (1922–1995)

- Born: 19 November 1922; Bristol, England
- Died: 13 March 1995 (aged 72)
- Occupation: University Professor

Kenneth A. Ballhatchet (19 November 1922 – 13 March 1995) was a British historian and university professor.

== Biography ==
He was born in Bristol on 19 November 1922.

He was educated at Clifton College, Bristol. He graduated from Peterhouse, Cambridge, where after an interruption for wartime service he received a first in Part II of the historical tripos in 1947.

Ballhatchet was appointed lecturer in history at SOAS in 1948, leaving there to take up a readership at the University of Oxford. He returned to SOAS as Professor of the History of South Asian in 1965, retiring in 1988. He is also listed as a contributor to the Encyclopedia Britannica and the article on James Broun-Ramsay, 1st Marquess of Dalhousie was largely written by him.

He died on 13 March 1995. After his death a Festschrift was published in his honour by Peter Robb.

== Bibliography ==
His notable books include:

- Race, sex, and class under the Raj : imperial attitudes and policies and their critics, 1793-1905
- Social policy and social change in western India, 1817-1830
- The City in South Asia : pre-modern and modern
- Society and ideology : essays in South Asian history
- Class, caste and Catholicism in India 1789-1914
- Changing South Asia
