= Shripad Damodar Satwalekar =

Indian polymath (1867–1968)

Shripad Damodar Satwalekar (19 September 1867 – 31 July 1968) was a polymath with interests in painting, social health, Ayurveda, Yoga, and Vedic literature. He was also the founder of the Swadhyay Mandal - A Vedic Research Institute.

== Early life and education ==
Shripad Damodar Satwalekar was born in the Princely state of Sawantwadi, now part of Sindhudurg district in the Present day Indian state of Maharashtra to Damodar Pant and Lakshmi Bai. He attended J J School of Art in Bombay and worked for six months at the same institute as a tutor.

== Artistic career ==
Satwalekar began his career as an artist, painter, and photographer with a studio in the city of Lahore, Punjab State. He mainly painted portraits of Maharajas and other prominent personalities of the day. Under the patronage of Bhawanrao Pant Pratinidhi, the ruler of Aundh near Satara, Satwalekar started doing paintings along with vedic research. Within a short period he became popularly known as Pandit Satwalekar due to his excellence and concentration on Vedic research. He published and edited journals like Amrit Lata, Veda Sandesh and Purusharth. In 1900, he opened his own painting studio in South Hyderabad.

== Literary works ==
Satwalekar was interested in both individual and social health, Ayurveda, Yoga, and Vedas (particularly in the analysis of the Vedas at the level of adhibhuta) and wrote several books on these subjects, including '

- Subodha Bhāṣya, etc.
- Rigveda Samhita
- Atharveda in Hindi.
- Puruṣārtha-Bodhinī-Bhāṣā-Ṭīkā - A four volume Commentary on Bhagavad Gita - S.Rama calls this the best commentary on the Gita by a 20th century author
- Translation of the Mahabharata - The Government of India assigned the task of translating the constituted text of the Mahabharata published by the Bhandarkar Oriental Research Institute to Satwalekar. After his death, the task was taken up by Shrutisheel Sharma.

== Social work ==
As early as in 1884, he started an institute for Sanskrit enthusiasts, Samskruta Vyaakhyaana Mandala. He established the Vivekavardhini Vidyaalaya, a public lecture hall, a gymnasium for young people, and so forth. For years he was associated with the Arya Samaj and the Theosophical Society. At one point of time, he served as a teacher of Vedas and painting at Kangadi Gurukula in Haridwar.

== Promoter of yoga and ayurveda ==
Satwalekar was associated with several social service and outreach activities. He was a proponent of yoga and advised Gandhi on the subject. During his stay in Aundh he worked with the Raja Bhawanrao to promote Surya Namaskar.

== Awards, honors and recognitions ==
Satwalekar was awarded the Padma Bhushan in 1968. He was conferred the Mayo Award twice, once for painting and once for sculpting.
