= Aundh Experiment =

Early test of village-level self-government in British India

The Aundh Experiment was an early test of village-level self-government in British India which began in 1938 in Aundh State in present-day Maharashtra. Mohandas Gandhi, and Maurice Frydman helped to draft the November Declaration, which handed over rule of Aundh State from the Raja to the residents, and became law in the Swaraj Constitution of Aundh in 1939. The Aundh Experiment was an unusual idea in pre-independence India, where the rulers of princely states were loath to hand over their power.

== Development and ratification ==
At the time, Aundh was a princely state in British India, ruled by generations of Rajas since 1699. Unlike the Provinces of India, which were ruled directly by the British government, the princely states had a certain degree of autonomy—with each state making its own treaty with the British Monarch. In 1938, the ruler of Aundh, Raja Bhavanrao Srinivasrao, was approached by Frydman (also known as Swami Bharatananda), a Polish engineer who was a disciple of Gandhi. According to the Raja's son, Apa Pant, "Frydman had great influence with my father, and on his seventy-fifth birthday he said, 'Raja Saheb, why don't you go and make a declaration to Mahatma Gandhi that you are giving all power to the people because it will help in the freedom struggle.'"

Raja Bhavanrao was a strong supporter of the Indian independence movement, and stood up for the welfare of the people of Aundh, "in sharp contrast to the attitude and behavior of the majority of Maharajas and Rajas", according to Indira Gandhi. The Raja readily endorsed the idea of self-government, Frydman wrote a draft declaration, and the Raja and his son traveled to Wardha to see Gandhi. There, Gandhi dictated the final draft of the constitution, which was sent to the state assembly to be ratified on 21 January 1939.

The Raja was a self-proclaimed nationalist, and the beginning of the experiment in 1938 caused concern among the British rulers, who reprimanded him for being a friend of Gandhi, who they called "the rebel against the Raj." In response, Jawaharlal Nehru and the Indian National Congress offered their support to the Raja.

Swaraj, or self-rule, was the foundation of Gandhi's movement for independence from British domination, and included the principles of decentralised self-governance and community building. At the inauguration of the constitution, Raja Bhavanrao affirmed Gandhi's ideals of Swaraj, declaring that:

We have to urge the people of Aundh to remember always that government being control, self government implies self-control and self-sacrifice. In the new era that is coming to Aundh, and we hope to the whole of our country, the strong will serve the weak, the wealthy will serve the poor, the learned will serve the illiterate. Self government without this spirit of service and sacrifice is bound to decay into some form or other of exploitation.

== After ratification ==
After ratification, the state of Aundh was reorganized from the ground up, with local administration put in the hands of village panchayats with five elected representatives, voted into office through new voting rights given to all adults. Each panchayat chose a president, who represented them at regional taluka councils. Each taluka council chose a president and two representatives to a Central Assembly presided over by the raja. In spite of the Raja's role as leader of the Assembly, responsibility for regional government was, for all practical purposes, in the hands of the people. The panchayats were given responsibility for all matters relating to education, welfare, water supply, sanitation, construction and maintenance of roads and public buildings, and all other activities relating to the health safety, and social and economic wellbeing of the villagers.

Between 1939 and 1945, twenty-seven new primary schools were established, making more than one per village. In addition, fourteen middle schools and three high schools were built and staffed, with the total number of teachers more than doubling. Adult education also saw a doubling of expenditure.

Several Indian National Congress leaders from Maharashtra became actively involved in the Aundh Experiment in the 1940s, including Tatya Shikhare, Annasaheb Sahasrabudhe, and Nana and Bhau Dharmadhikari. When Achutrao Patwardan went into hiding to avoid arrest during the Quit India movement in 1946, he used Aundh villages as his base of operations. He went as far as adopting the language of the Aundh State Constitution, declaring that he and his band of freedom fighters were "Prati Sakar"—"self-governing and independent of the Central Authority."

The Aundh Experiment in village-level self-rule ended with Indian independence in 1947, when all of the princely states were merged into the new Dominion of India though Apa Pant and others tried hard to continue the village self rule model beyond Independence.

== See also ==
- Swaraj
- Opposition to the partition of India
- Sarvodaya
- Swadeshi movement
