= Vishalgad =

Hill fort in Maharashtra, India

Vishalgad Fort
- Part of Kolhapur
- Maharashtra, India
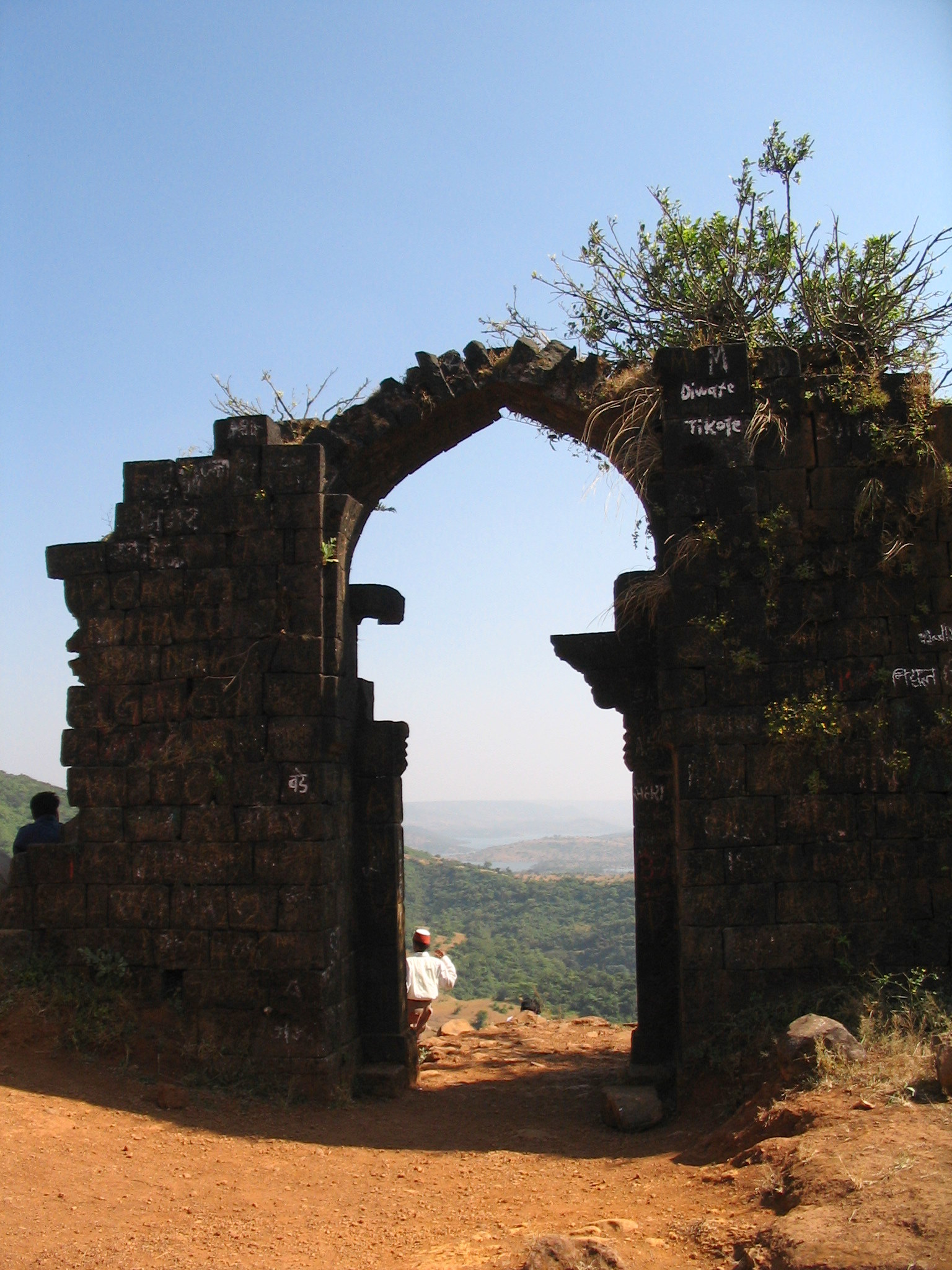
- Entrance gateway of Vishalgad Fort

Site information
- Type: Hill fort
- Owner: Government of India
- Controlled by: Shilahara dynasty (1178–1216); Yadavas of Devagiri (1216–1317); Surve Dynasty (1317–1471); Bahamani Sultanate (1471–1525); Bijapur Sultanate (1525–1660); Maratha Empire (1660–1689; 1707–1818); Mughal Empire (1689–1707); East India Company (1818–1858); British Empire (1858–1947); Government of India (1947–present)
- Open to the public: Yes

Location
- Shown within Maharashtra
- Coordinates: 16°54′22″N 73°44′36″E
- Height: 1090 m

Site history
- Built: 1178–1209
- Built by: Bhoja II
- In use: 1178–1947
- Materials: Basalt; Granite; Lime mortar Lead

Vishalgad (also known as Khelna) is a hill fort located in Bhudargad of Kolhapur district, Maharashtra, India. The fort was built by the last Shilahara dynasty ruler Bhoja II between 1178 and 1209 CE. In 1216, it was captured by the Yadava ruler Simhana II after the defeat of the Shilahara forces, leading to the annexation of the Shilahara dynasty into the Yadava state.

After the decline of the Yadava dynasty, control of the fort passed to the Surves, a Suryavanshi dynasty that had migrated from Saurashtra to the Konkan region and established its kingdom there. In 1471, the Bahmani Kingdom general Mahmud Gawan laid siege to Vishalgad, compelling the Surves to surrender the fort. Owing to its strategic location, Vishalgad subsequently became a focal point of several military conflicts in the Deccan, involving the Bahamani Sultanate, the Vijayanagara Empire, the Surves, and later the Sultanate of Bijapur, Mughal Empire and the Maratha Empire.

== See also ==
- Battle of Khelna
- List of forts in Maharashtra
