= Aundh State =

Maratha princely state in the British Raj

Coordinates: 17°32′45″N 74°22′30″E

- 1699–1948
- Flag

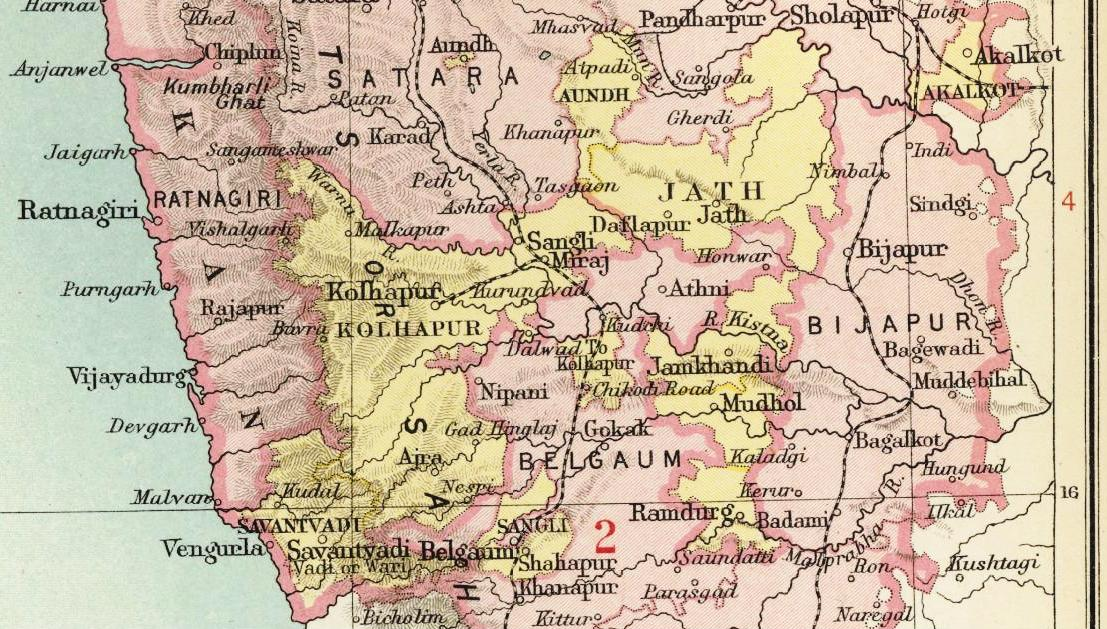
- Aundh State in the Imperial Gazetteer of India
- Government: Jagir (1699–1849); Princely state (1849–1948)
- History
  - Established: 1699
  - Independence of India: 1948

Area
- 1941: 1,298 km^{2} (501 sq mi)

Population
  - 1941: 88,762
Preceded by	Succeeded by
Maratha Empire	India
- Today part of: Maharashtra, India
- This article incorporates text from a publication now in the public domain: Chisholm, Hugh, ed. (1911). "Aundh". Encyclopædia Britannica (11th ed.). Cambridge University Press.

Aundh State was a Maratha princely state during the British Raj, in the Deccan States Agency division of the Bombay Presidency. The Principality of Aundh covered an area of 1298 square kilometers with a population of 88,762 in 1941. The capital of the state was Aundh, currently in the Satara district of Maharashtra.

It is known for the Aundh Experiment, a bold effort at empowering villages with self governance from 1939 to 1947.

== History ==
Aundh was a Jagir granted by Chhatrapati Sambhaji to Parshuram Trimbak Pant Pratinidhi, who was a general, administrator and later Pratinidhi of the Maratha Empire during the reign of Chhatrapati Sambhaji and Chhatrapati Rajaram. He played a crucial role in re-capturing Panhala Fort, Ajinkyatara (at Satara), Bhupalgad forts from Mughals during period of 1700–1705.

After the fall of Peshwa rule, the British East India company entered separate treaties in 1820 with all the Jagirdars who were nominally subordinate to the Raja of Satara. Akalkot, Aundh, Nimsod, Bhor, Daphlapur, Jath, and Phaltan, which were Jagirs of Satara State, became tributaries to the British when Satara state was abolished in 1849. The last ruler of the Aundh was Raja Shrimant Bhawanrao Shriniwasrao Pant Pratinidhi ("Bala Sahib"). The state joined the Union of India on 8 March 1948.

== Rulers ==
Aundh's Hindu rulers used the title of "Pant Pratinidhi".

Foundation of the state Aundh
1690 / 1699
Princes (Rajas), with the title Pant Pratinidhi
From	To	Raja	Born	Died
1697	27 May 1718	Parusharam Trimbak	1660	1718
1718	25 November 1746	Shrinivasrao Parashuram	1687	1746
1746	1754	Jagjivanrao Parashuram	1691	1754
1754	5 April 1776	Shrinivasrao Gangadhar		1776
1776	30 August 1777	Bhagwant Rao		1777
30 August 1777	11 June 1848	Parashuramrao Shrinivas I "Thoto Pant" (Peshwa prisoner 1806–1818)	1777	1848
11 June 1848	1901	Shrinivasrao Parashuram "Anna Sahib"	27 November 1833	1901
1901	1905	Parashuramrao Shrinivas II "Dada Sahib"	17 February 1858	1905
3 November 1905	4 November 1909	Gopalkrishnarao Parashuram "Nana Sahib"	26 January 1879	
4 November 1909	15 August 1947	Bhawanrao Shriniwasrao Pant Pratinidhi "Bala Sahib"	24 October 1868	13 April 1951
Prime-minister
From	To	Raja	Born	Died
1944	1948	Parshuram Rao Pant "Appa Sahib"	1912-09-11	1992-10-05

The Line is nominally Continued
From	To	Raja	Born	Died
1951	1962	Shrimant Bhagwant Rao Trimbak "Bapu Sahib"	1919	2007-04-08

== See also ==
- Shree Mulpeeth Yamai Devi Temple
- Pant Pratinidhi family
- Aundh Experiment
- List of Indian princely states
- Apa Pant

== Bibliography ==
- Rothermund, Indira (1983). The Aundh Experiment: A Gandhian Grass-roots Democracy. Somaiya Publications.
- Pant, Apa (1989). An Unusual Raja: Mahatma Gandhi and the Aundh Experiment. Sangam Books.
- Bond, J.W (2006). Indian States: A Biographical, Historical, and Administrative Survey. Asian Educational Services.
- Pant, Apa (1990). An Extended Family Or Fellow Pilgrims. Sangam Books.
