= Pratinidhi =

Minister of a historical Indian polity

The Pratinidhi (the Viceroy) was an important member of the ministry in the Maratha Empire. The title of Pratinidhi means the representative of the King, and such officials were entitled to sign and seal papers and issue orders in the absence of the Ruler. Shivaji's ministry of the eight - the Ashta Pradhan did not include a Pratinidhi. Later the post of Pant Pratinidhi was created during the Rajaram I reign and a person holding this office exercised powers over all ministers of the Maratha court including the Peshwas. Above the Ashta pradhan Rajaram I appointed Pralhad Niraji to the high post of Prathinidhi. The office of Pratinidhi was created and the office of Peshwa was made next to it in hierarchy. The first occupant of the position under Rajaram was Pralhad Niraji, who was appointed in 1689.

The offices of the Pratinidhi, the Sacheev and the Mantri, became hereditary after passing through three different families.

In 1698, Parshuram Pant Pratinidhi was appointed as Pratinidhi by Rajaram I, but by the end of 1713 the family had become hereditary holders of the title Pant Pratinidhi

== Bibliography ==
- Pant, Apa (1989). An Unusual Raja: Mahatma Gandhi and the Aundh Experiment. Sangam Books. ISBN 9780861317523.
- Udgaonkar, P.B (1986). Political Institutions & Administration. Motilal Banarsidass Publications. ISBN 9788120820876.
- Bond, J.W (2006). Indian States: A Biographical, Historical, and Administrative Survey. Asian Educational Services. ISBN 9788120619654.
- Bhatia, Harbans Singh (1986). Political, Legal, and Military History of India, Volume 6. Deep & Deep Publications.
