= List of Deshastha Brahmins =

Deshastha Brahmins form a major sub-caste of Brahmins in states of Maharashtra and North Karnataka in India. They are also found in sizeable number in the states of Andhra Pradesh, Telangana, Madhya Pradesh, and Tamil Nadu. The following is the list of notables from the community.

== Religious figures ==
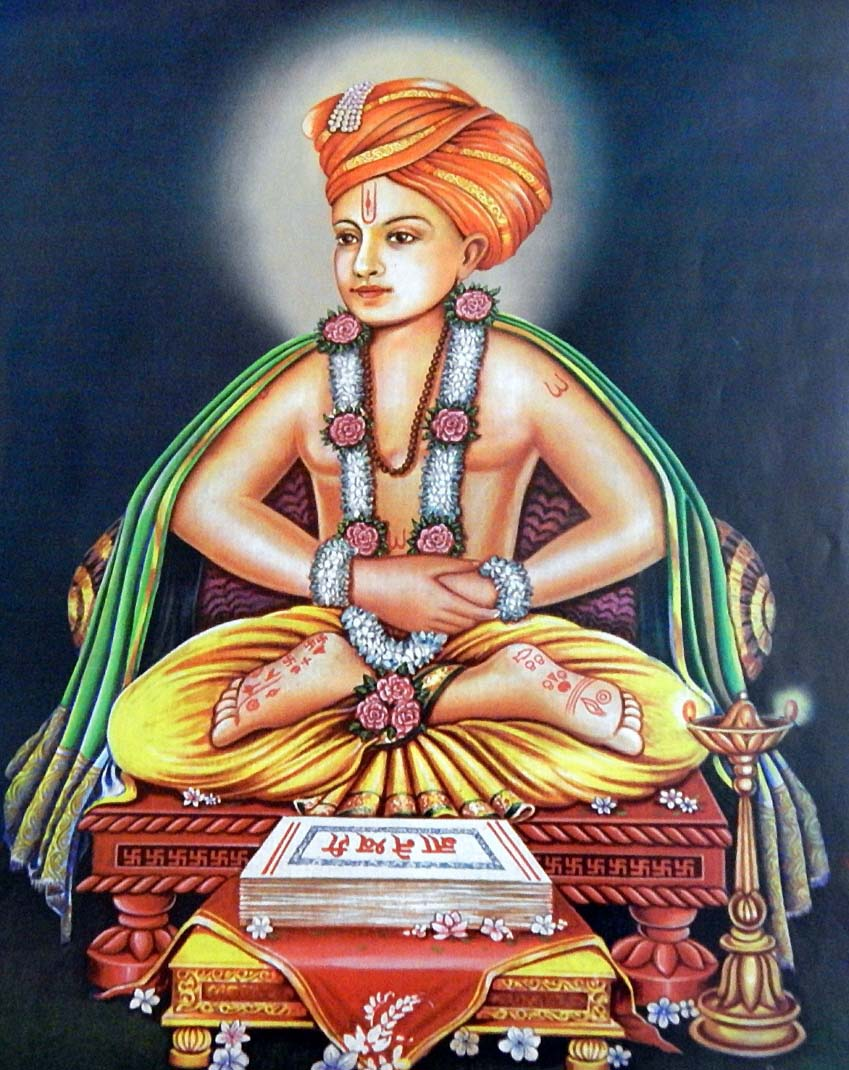
Dnyaneshwar, a 13th-century Marathi Varkari saint

- Nivruttinath (1273–1297) - older brother of Dynaneshwar; Varkari saint and philosopher
- Dnyaneshwar (1275–1296) - 13th-century Marathi Varkari saint, poet, philosopher and yogi of the Nath Vaishnava tradition
- Sopan (1277-1296) - saint of the Varkari sect; younger brother of saint Dnyaneshwar
- Muktabai (1279-1297) - younger sister of Saint Dynaneshwar; Varkari saint and philosopher
- Chakradhar Swami - 13th century Vaishnava saint; founder of the Mahanubhava sect.
- Padmanabha Tirtha (Shobhana Bhatta) (samadhi 1324 CE), a Hindu Dvaita philosopher, dialectician, the direct disciple of Madhvacharya and the acharya who is known for spreading Tattvavada outside the Tulunadu region.
- Jayatirtha (1345 – 1388) - a Hindu Dvaita philosopher, dialectician, polemicist and the 6th pontiff of Madhvacharya Peetha.
- Morya Gosavi - a prominent 14th century saint of the Hindu Ganapatya sect.
- Narasimha Saraswati - A prominent 14th Century Indian Guru of the Dattatreya Tradition (Sampradaya) . According to the Gurucharitra, he is considered as the 2nd Avatara of Dattatreya in this yuga.
- Damaji - Prominent Saint of the Varkari Sect of Hinduism. He was the Kamavisdar of Mangalvedha under the reign of the Bahmani kingdom of Bidar
- Bhanudasa (1448–1513) - a Hindu Varkari saint and devotee of Vithobha.
- Purandara Dasa (1484 - 1564) - a Haridasa, Dvaita philosopher and saint; Pitamaha of Carnatic Music.
- Janardan Swami (1504 -1575) - a prominent Marathi sant, a poet of Varkari sampradaya, a devotee of Dattatreya and the guru of Eknath.
- Vijayindra Tirtha (1514 - 1595) - a Dvaita philosopher, dialectician and prolific writer, who authored 104 works on Dvaita Vedanta.
- Raghuttama Tirtha (1548 - 1595) - a Dvaita philosopher, scholar, saint and mystic; 14th pontiff of Uttaradi Math
- Eknath (1533–1599) - Marathi saint, scholar, and religious poet of the Varkari Sampradaya
- Saraswati Gangadhar - 16th Century poet and author of Gurucharitra. Even though his mother tongue was Kannada, he was considered a prolific writer in Marathi.
- Dasopant (1551–1615) - Marathi poet-saint and prolific writer of Varkari sect.; also known as Daso Digambar
- Vaman Pandit (1608–1695) - a Marathi poet and scholar, who composed poems and kirthanas on Lord Krishna and gave a sound metaphysical foundation to the concept of Bhakti in Maharashtra.
- Raghunath Pandit - a 17th-century Marathi poet, scholar of Pant-Sahitya.
- Samarth Ramdas (1608–1681) - Hindu Vaishnava saint from Maharashtra
- Shridhar Pandit (Shridhar Swami Nazarekar) (1658–1729) - author of works of devotional literature in marathi: Harivijaya, RamVijaya, Shivlilamrut, PandavaPratap, and the AmbikaUdaya; his real name was Khadake Nazarekar
- Vijaya Dasa (1682–1755) - a prominent Hindu saint from the Haridasa tradition of Karnataka, India.
- Mahipati (1715–1790) - author of Bhaktavijaya, a Marathi language biography of Varkari and other Hindu saints
- Satyadharma Tirtha (1743-1830) - a Dvaita philosopher, scholar, saint and mystic; 28th pontiff of Uttaradi Math .
- Manik Prabhu (1817 - 1865) - An early 19th-century Hindu Vaishnava saint, philosopher, poet and mystic.
- Bhausaheb Maharaj (1843 - 1914) - a Hindu saint, philosopher and founder of Inchegeri Sampradaya.
- Brahmachaitanya (Gondavalekar Maharaj) (1845 - 1913) - a Hindu Saint, a spiritual Master, and a devotee of Lord Rama, who advocated Namajapa using the 13 letters Ramanamamantra — "Śrī Rām Jai Rām Jai Jai Rām" to attain enlightenment.
- Shri Madhavnath Maharaj (1857–1936) - Hindu saint, of Karvi, Chitrakoot, Madhya Pradesh, who continued the Nath Sampradaya of the famous Navnaths in India.
- Shreedhar Swami (1908-1973) - a prominent Kannada-Marathi saint and religious poet in the Hindu tradition. He was a devotee of Lord Rama and a disciple of shree Ramdas Swami.
- Shriramkrishna kshirsagar

== Historical figures ==
=== Seuna dynasty (860–1317) ===
- Hemadpant (Hemadri Pandit) - prime minister from 1259 to 1274 C.E. in the regimes of Kings Mahādeva (1259–1271) and Ramachandra (1271–1309) of Seuna Yādava Dynasty of Devagiri, which ruled in the western and southern part of India and also the founder of Hemadpanti architecture.

=== Nizams of Hyderabad Deccan ===
==== Prime Ministers ====
- Vitthal Sundar Parshurami (popularly known as Vitthal Sundar) - a diplomat and the Prime Minister of Hyderabad during the reign of Nizam Ali Khan (Asaf Jah II) from 8 July 1762 until his death on 10 August 1763.
- Renuka Das Bhalerao (popularly known as Sham Raj Rai Rayan) - a general, a member of noble Rai Rayan family and the Prime Minister of Hyderabad during the reign of Nizam Sikandar Jah from 1795 - 1797.

=== Maratha Empire (1674–1818) ===
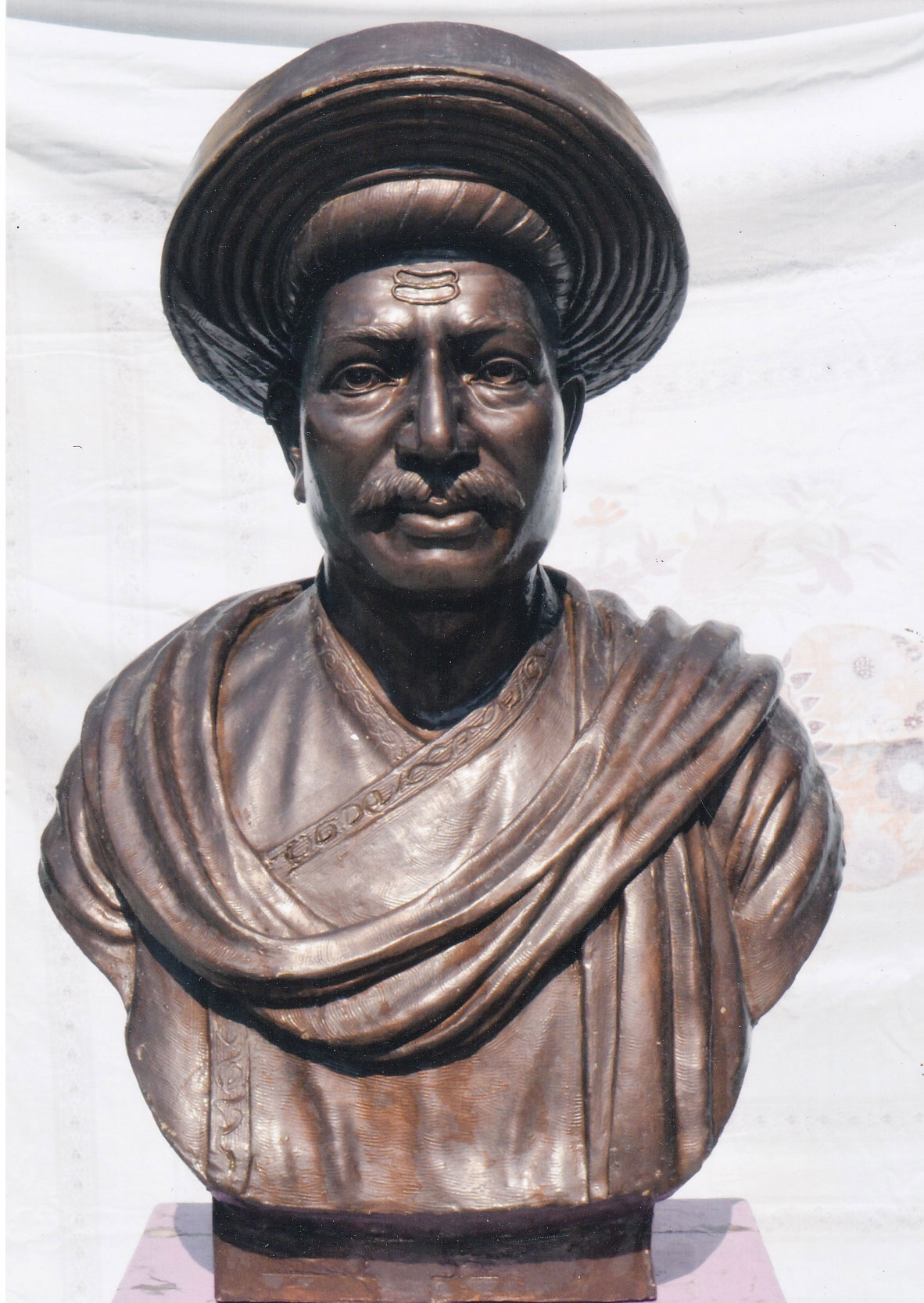
Bust of Ramchandra Pant Amatya

==== Peshwas ====
- Moropant Trimbak Pingle (1657–1683) - the first Peshwa in Shivaji Maharaj's Asthapradhan mandal
- Nilakanth Moreshvar Pingale (1683-1689) - the second Peshwa of the Maratha Empire and elder son of Moropant Trimbak Pingle.
- Ramchandra Pant Amatya (1689-1708) - Amatya, Peshwa and Hukumat Panah of the Maratha Empire during the reign of Shivaji and Rajaram I.
- Bahiroji Pingale (1708–1711) - the fourth Peshwa of the Maratha Empire and the younger son of Moropant Trimbak Pingle.
- Parshuram Trimbak Kulkarni (1711–1713) - the fifth Peshwa of the Maratha Empire and also the founder of Aundh and Vishalgad Samsthanams.

==== Sachivs ====
- Annaji Datto Sacheev - was the Sachiv in the Ashta Pradhan mandal of Maratha Empire during the rule of Chhatrapathi Shivaji.
- Shankaraji Narayan Gandekar and his descendants were hereditary Sachiv's of Maratha Empire and the rulers of Bhor.

==== Pratinidhis ====
- Pralhad Niraji - was the Pratinidhi of the Maratha Empire during the reign of Chatrapathi Rajaram I. He was the first occupant of the position of Pratinidhi.
- Parshuram Pant Pratinidhi and his descendants were the hereditary Pratinidhi's of the Maratha Empire and also the rulers of Aundh and Vishalgad.
- Krishnarao Pant Pratinidhi- 17th Century Maratha General and was the pratinidhi of Tara Bai in Kolhapur, India. He was the son of the famous Parshuram Pant Pratinidhi

==== Other notable Maratha Empire people ====
- Dadoji Konddeo - administrator of Shahaji's fiefdom .
- The Vinchurkars - generals and nobles at the Peshwa court
- The Purandares - generals and nobles at the Peshwa court
- The Chandrachuds - generals and nobles at the Peshwa court
- Melgiri Pandit -Maratha Sardar who served under Sambhaji of the Maratha empire. A Brahmin from near Melgiri Karnataka-Maharashtra. He was known for successfully leading the Maratha army at Bijapur.
- Ramshastri Prabhune, was the Chief Justice (Mukhya Nyayadhish or "Pantnyayadhish") in the apex court of the Maratha Empire in the latter half of the 18th century, during the heyday of that empire. He is best remembered for having passed strictures against the sitting Peshwa of the time for instigating murder. Ram Shastri's integrity in public affairs is regarded as a model for all times.
- Sakharam Bapu Bokil - regent to Madhavrao II.
- Niranjan Madhav Parasnis - diplomat, who also worked as Parasnis under Peshwa Bajirao I.
- Anandarayar Sahib, Diwan of the Thanjavur Maratha kingdom during the reigns of Shahuji I, Serfoji I and Tukkoji.

=== British Empire (1858 to 1947) ===
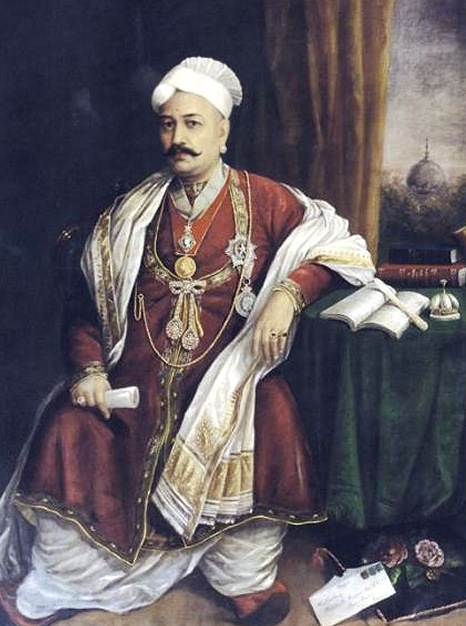
Rajah T. Madhava Rao Diwan of Travancore, Baroda and Indore, a painting by Raja Ravi Verma.

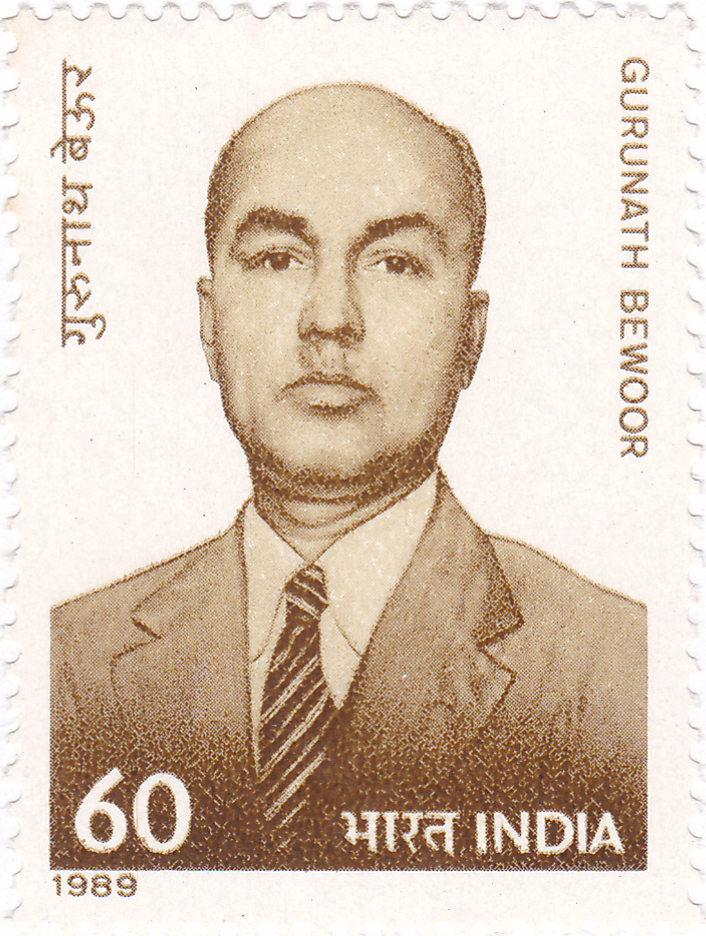
Gurunath Venkatesh Bewoor on 1989 commemorative stamp of India.

==== Rulers ====
- Pant Pratinidhi Rajas of Aundh State and Vishalgad estate.
- Gandekar Rajas of Bhor State
- Rao Saheb Rajas of Arni estate.
- Vinchurkar rulers of Vinchur estate
- Bawadekar rulers of Bavda estate

==== Diwans and other higher officials ====
During the rule of British Raj the most powerful Brahmin bureaucrats in the South India were Deshastha Brahmins. In 19th century, out of 305 high level administrative officials 174 were from Deshastha Brahmin community, while 83 were drawn from other Brahmin groups in South India.

- T. Madhava Rao (1829–1891) - Diwan of Travancore, 1857–1872; Diwan of Indore, 1873–1875; Diwan of Baroda, 1875 – 1882.
- T. Ananda Rao (1852 – 1919)- 18th Diwan of Mysore. He was the eldest son of Sir T. Madhava Rao
- T. Rama Rao (1831 – 1895) - Diwan of Travancore from 1887 to 1892
- R. Raghunatha Rao (1831 – 1912) - Dewan Bahadur of the princely state of Indore during British Raj from 1875 to 1888.
- T. Venkata Rao - Diwan of Travancore from 1821 to 1829.
- T. Subba Rao - Diwan of Travancore for two times from 1830 to 1837 and 1839 to 1842.
- V. P. Madhava Rao (1850 – 1934)- 17th Diwan of Mysore
- N. Madhava Rao (1887 – 1972) - 23rd Diwan of Mysore
- Venkata Rayar - Diwan of Cochin kingdom from 1856 to 1860.
- K. Krishnaswamy Rao (1845 – 1923) - Diwan of Travancore from 1898 to 1904.
- T. Ramachandra Rao (1825-1879) - Indian civil servant and first native Indian to serve as Deputy Commissioner of Police of Madras.
- R. Ramachandra Rao (1871 – 1936) - Indian civil servant and mathematician.
- Gurunath Venkatesh Bewoor (1888 – 1950) - Indian civil servant, the Viceroy's Executive Council during the World War II. His son Gopal Gurunath Bewoor was 9th Chief of Army Staff.
- Raja Shamraj (1898-1987) - a member of noble Rai Rayan family and P. W. D. Member of H. E. H Nizam's Executive Council.
- Purnaiah (1746 -1812), 1st Diwan of Mysore.
- P. N. Krishnamurti (1849 - 1911), 16th Diwan of Mysore, 5th Jagirdar of Yelandur estate and great grandson of Diwan Purnaiah.
- Srinivasa IV Rao Sahib (1904-1989)- Twelfth and last ruler of the Jagir of Arni during the British Raj.
- D. S. Joshi (1908-Unknown) - Indian Civil Service of 1933 Batch who also served as the 9th Cabinet Secretary of India from 27 June 1966 to 31 December 1968

== Indian Independence Movement ==
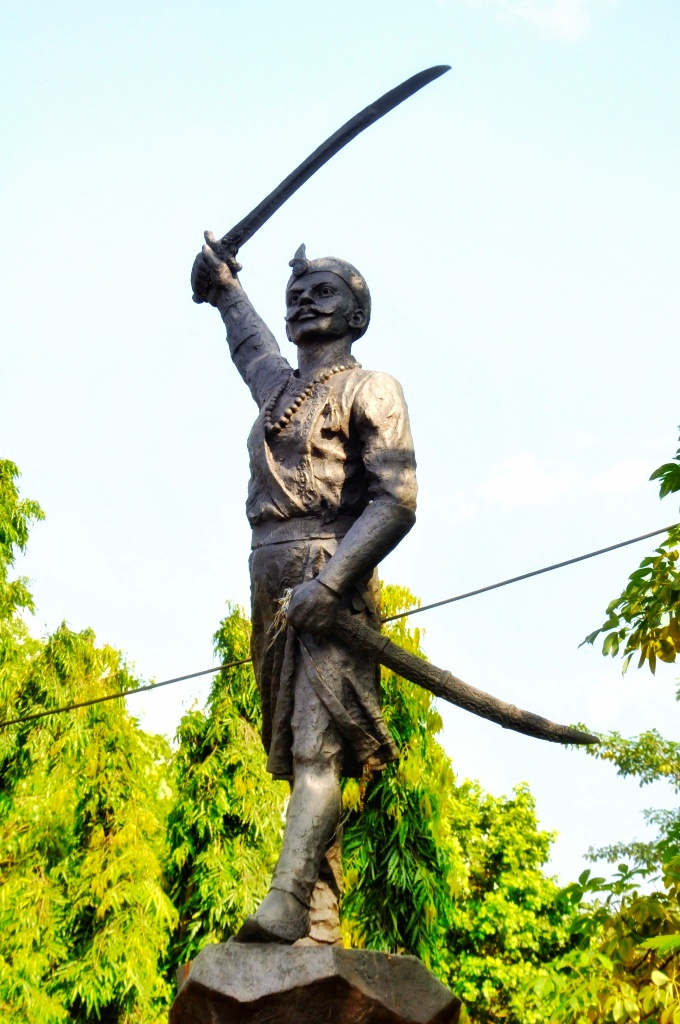
Statue of Tatya Tope

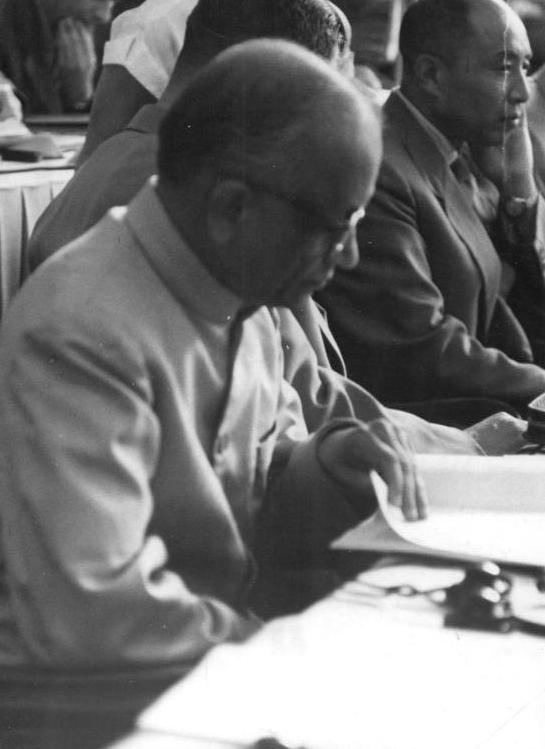
Shripad Amrit Dange, a founding member of the Communist Party of India (CPI).

=== Leaders of 1857 War of Independence ===
- Tantya Tope (Ramachandra Panduranga Yewalkar) (1814 - 1859) - one of the main military leaders of the Indian Rebellion of 1857

=== Revolutionaries ===
- Shivaram Hari Rajguru (1908–1931) - Indian revolutionary and associate of Bhagat Singh
- Vishnu Ganesh Pingle (1888-1915) - Indian revolutionary and member of the Ghadar Party who was one of those executed in 1915 following the Lahore conspiracy trial for his role in the Ghadar conspiracy.
- Pandurang Sadashiv Khankhoje (1884 – 1967) - Indian revolutionary, scholar, agricultural scientist and historian who was among the founding fathers of the Ghadar Party.

=== Others ===
- Balakrishna Shivram Moonje (1872–1948) - an Indian freedom fighter and early Hindu Nationalist leader
- Madhu Dandavate (1924 - 2005) - an Indian freedom fighter who participated in Quit India Movement and many other movements during Indian national movement. He was politician and worked as Union minister of Finance and Railways.
- Ganesh Shrikrishna Khaparde (1854 –1938) - an Indian lawyer, scholar, political activist and a founding member of Tilak's Indian Home Rule League.
- Shripad Amrit Dange (1899 – 1991) - a founding member of the Communist Party of India (CPI) and a stalwart of Indian trade union movement.
- Balkrishna Ganesh Khaparde (1882–1968) - Son of Ganesh Shrikrishna Khaparde, an Indian lawyer, a prominent leader in Swaraj Party and belonged to ‘Tilak School of Thought’.
- Madhav Shrihari Aney (1880 - 1968) (Loknayak Bapuji Aney) - educationist, freedom fighter, statesman, 2nd Governor of Bihar; follower of Lokmanya Tilak and recipient of Padma Vibhushan Award.
- Gangadharrao Balkrishna Deshpande (1871-1960) (also known as Lion of Karnataka) - an Indian activist who was the leader of the Indian independence movement against British colonial rule from Belgaum.
- R. Balaji Rao (1842–1896) - an Indian politician, independence activist, first Secretary of the Madras Mahajana Sabha, represented Tanjore along with S. A. Swaminatha Iyer at the first session of the Indian National Congress.
- Vasukaka Joshi (Vasudev Ganesh Joshi) (1856 - 1944) - a freedom fighter and sole owner of Chitrashala press of Pune.
- Dada Dharmadhikari (Shankar Trimbak Dharmadhikari) (1899 - 1985) - an Indian freedom fighter, and a leader of social reform movements in India.
- Pramila Dandavate (1928 – 2001)- a political activist from Mumbai, associated with the Praja Socialist Party and later with the Janata Party.

== Reformers and Social activists ==
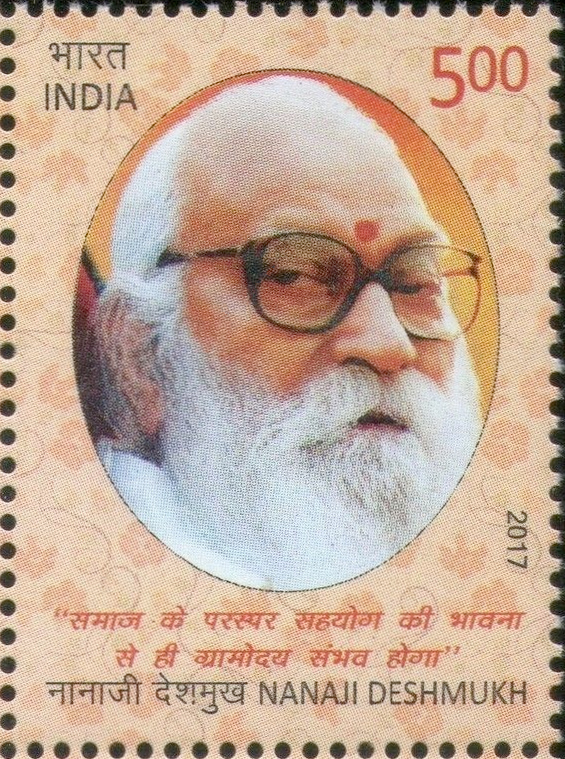
Bharat Ratna Nanaji Deshmukh on 2017 commemorative stamp of India.

- Nanaji Deshmukh (Chandikadas Amritrao Deshmukh) (1916 – 2010) - social reformer, founder of Bharatiya Jana Sangh Party, MP of BJP; Bharat Ratna
- Baba Amte (Murlidhar Devidas Amte) (1914 - 2008) - an Indian social worker and social activist known particularly for his work for the rehabilitation and empowerment of people suffering from leprosy; Winner of numerous awards and prizes including the Padma Vibhushan, the Dr. Ambedkar International Award, the Gandhi Peace Prize, the Ramon Magsaysay Award, the Templeton Prize and the Jamnalal Bajaj Award; also known as the modern Gandhi of India.
- N. Subba Rao Pantulu (1856 - 1941) - an Indian social activist and politician who served as a member of the Madras Legislative Council between 1893 and 1909 and also one of the founders of The Hindu.
- Keshav Rao Koratkar (1867 - 1932) - was a pioneer of political, social, and educational reforms in Hyderabad State, India. He later got involved in Indian independence movement.

== Bureaucrats and Diplomats ==
- Apasaheb Pant (1912 - 1992) - Indian prince, son of Raja Bhawanrao Shriniwasrao Pant Pratinidhi, Gandhian, writer, freedom fighter and diplomat; Ambassador to Indonesia (1961–64), Norway (1964–66), Egypt (1966–69), United Kingdom (1969–72) and Italy (1972–75); Winner of Padma Shri.
- Dattatraya Shridhar Joshi (born 11 October 1908) - 9th Cabinet Secretary of India from (27 June 1966 to 31 December 1968); Winner of Padma Vibhushan.
- C. R. Krishnaswamy Rao Sahib (1927 – 2013) - 15th Cabinet Secretary of India from (30 April 1981 – 8 February 1985);Winner of Padma Vibhushan.

== Jurists and lawyers ==
- Vishvanath Narayan Mandlik (1833 – 1899)- An eminent Bombay citizen, lawyer, author and an erudite expert on Hindu law. He served on the Supreme Legislative Council of India where his expertise on Hindu Law was held in high esteem.
- Pralhad Balacharya Gajendragadkar (1901 - 1981) - was the 7th Chief Justice of India, serving from 1 February 1964 – 15 March 1966; Recipient of Padma Vibhushan.
- Janardan Raghunath Mudholkar (1902 - 1983) - was the Judge of Supreme court of India from 3 October 1960 to 3 July 1966; son of Raghunath Narasinha Mudholkar.
- Gopal Rao Ekbote (1912 - 1994) - was the Chief Justice of Andhra Pradesh High Court from 1 April 1972 to 1 June 1974.
- Yeshwant Vishnu Chandrachud (1920 – 2008) - was the 16th Chief Justice of India, serving from 22 February 1978 to 11 July 1985.
- Chandrashekhar Shankar Dharmadhikari (1927 - 2019) - former acting Chief Justice of Bombay High Court, son of freedom fighter Dada Dharmadhikari; Winner of Padma Bhushan.
- Dhananjaya Y. Chandrachud (born 11 November 1959) is current Chief Justice of India. He has also previously served as the chief justice of the Allahabad High Court from 2013 to 2016 and as a judge of the Bombay High Court from 2000 to 2013.

== Politics ==
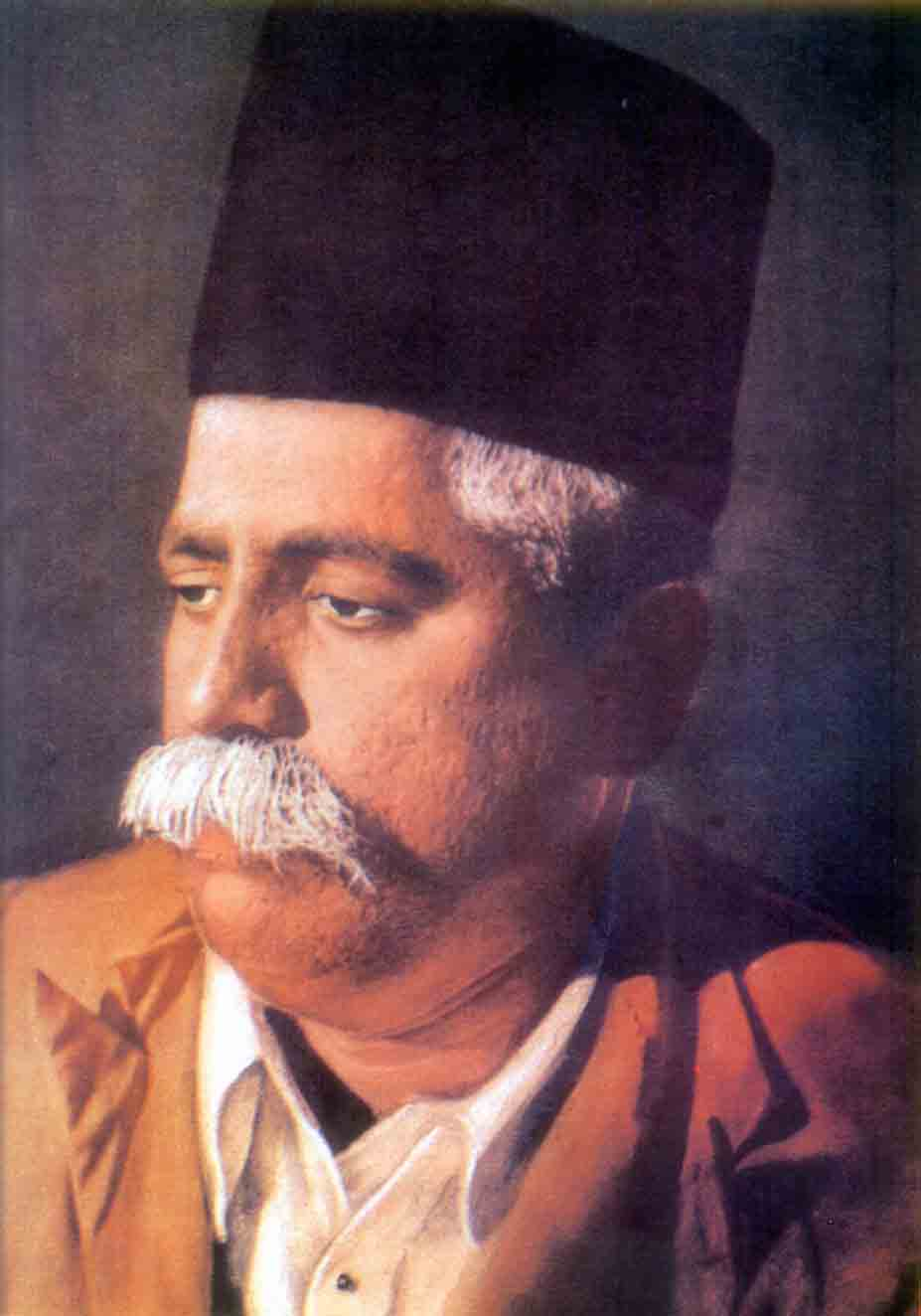
Portrait of K. B. Hedgewar, founder of RSS.

- Pramod Mahajan (1949–2006) - BJP politician, former Minister of Communications, Information Technology and Parliamentary Affairs. He was murdered by his brother.
- Raghunath Narasinha Mudholkar (1857 - 1921) - an Indian politician who served as the President of the Indian National Congress.
- Ram Naik, BJP, formerly the 24th Governor of Uttar Pradesh
- Vinayak Rao Koratkar (1895 – 1962) was a political leader of Hyderabad State and Member of Indian Parliament. He is son of Keshav Rao Koratkar.
- Hari Vinayak Pataskar (1892 - 1970) - an Indian lawyer and politician who was a member of the Constituent Assembly of India and 2nd Governor of Madhya Pradesh and Winner of Padma Vibhushan Award.
- Narayan Malhar Joshi (1879 – 1955), Trade Union leader, founded the Social Services League, also founder of All India Trade Union Congress along with Lala Lajpat Rai.
- Keshav Baliram Hedgewar (1889–1940) - founder of Rashtriya Swayamsevak Sangh (RSS).
- Prabhakar Balwant Dani (1908-1965) Member of the RSS, He served in senior positions of the RSS and played a large role in spreading the RSS network in the erstwhile Indian state of Madhya Bharat.
- Madhukar Dattatraya Deoras (1915 - 1996) - the fourth Sarsanghchalak of the Rashtriya Swayamsevak Sangh (RSS).
- Manohar Joshi (original surname ‘Brahme’) (1937-2024) was Chief Minister of Maharashtra from 1995 to 1999 and Speaker of the Lok Sabha from 2002 to 2004.
- Nitin Gadkari (1957 - ) who is serving as the 40th Minister of Road Transport & Highways in the Government of India since 2014. He is also the longest-serving Minister for Road Transport & Highways, currently in his tenure for over ten years. He is the only person to serve under a single portfolio for three consecutive terms.Being one of the senior leader of Bharatiya Janata Party (BJP), he served as the President of his party from 2009 to 2013.

== Arts ==
=== Cinema and theatre ===
- Gajanan Jagirdar (1907–1988) - veteran Indian film director, screenwriter and actor. He worked in Hindi Cinema, also called Bollywood, as well as Marathi cinema.

=== Artists ===
- Narayan Shridhar Bendre (1910 - 1992) - a 20th-century Indian artist and one of the founder members of Baroda Group; Winner of Padma Bhushan.

=== Literature ===
==== Scholars & poets ====
- Bhavabhuti – was an 8th-century Sanskrit scholar of India noted for his plays and poetry.
- Gaga Bhatt - a 17th century scholar presiding over the coronation of Shivaji. Divākara Bhațț(his father), Kamalakara Bhatt(his uncle) and Narayan Bhatt, his grandfather were also scholars of repute.
- Neelakantha Chaturdhara, a 17th Century Sanskrit scholar known for his commentary on the Mahabharata called Bhāratabhāvadīpa.
- Bhaskara Appaji Agnihotri, a 17th century Sanskrit scholar known for his work on anatomy "Sharira Padmini" and other prominent works such as "Padyamritatarangini" and "Smritiprakasa".
- Bhattoji Diksita - 17th Century Sanskrit scholar and grammarian famous for authoring the Siddhantakaumudi
- Pralhad Keshav Atre, (1898 – 1969) (popularly known as "Acharya Atre") - Marathi writer, poet, educationist, a movie producer–director–script writer and orator; Winner of President's Gold Medal
- Ram Joshi - (1762 - 1812) Marathi poet, known for his works in Lavani, Powada, and Tamasha genre.
- Kusumagraj (Vishnu Vaman Shirwadkar) (1912 – 1999) - a Marathi poet, playwright, novelist, short story writer; Jnanpith and Padma Bhushan awardee
- Navaratna Rama Rao (1877 – 1960) - an Indian writer and scholar from Karnataka.
- Vaman Malhar Joshi (1882 – 1943)- a Marathi writer.
- Lakshman Shastri Joshi (1901–1994) - scholar of Sanskrit, Hindu Dharma, and a Marathi literary critic, and supporter of Indian independence. Awardee of Padma Vibhushan and Padma Bhushan awards
- Galagali Ramacharya (1892-1981)- Noted Indian Sanskrit scholar and poet of two Mahakavyas. He also received honorary Mahamahopadhyaya honor from Bharatiya Sanskrit Sansthan Parishad Prayag.
- Rajeshwar Shastri Dravid (1899 - 1950) - Indian writer, scholar, grammarian and translator of Sanskrit literature; Winner of Padma Bhushan.
- Siddheshwar Shastri Chitrav (1894 - 1984) - Indian Vedic scholar, lexicographer, translator and writer of Marathi literature; Winner of Padma Shri.
- Bal Sitaram Mardhekar (1909 – 1956) - a prominent Marathi writer and winner of Sahitya Akademi Award
- Ganesh Trimbak Deshpande (1910 - 1989) - an Indian writer, scholar and winner of Sahitya Akademi Award
- Shrikrushna Keshav Kshirsagar (1901–1980) - Marathi writer from Maharashtra, India.
- Shridhar Bhaskar Warnekar (1918-2007)- Sanskrit Scholar famous for authoring the Mahakavya ShriShivarajyodayam. This work won the Sahitya Akademi Award for Sanskrit in 1974
- Gajanan Digambar Madgulkar (popularly known as "Ga Di Mā") (1919 - 1977) - Marathi poet, lyricist, writer and actor. Awardee of Padma Shri.
- Vyankatesh Digambar Madgulkar (1927 - 2001) - younger brother of Gajanan Digambar Madgulkar, one of the most popular Marathi writers of his time and winner of the Sahitya Akademi Award
- Vinayaka Krishna Gokak (1909 – 1992) - a writer in the Kannada language and a scholar of English and Kannada literature. Winner of Jnanpith Award
- Ram Shri Mugali (1906 – 1993) - a writer in the Kannada language and winner of the Sahitya Akademi Award.
- G. A. Kulkarni (1923-1987)- writer in the Marathi language. winner of Sahitya Akademi Award.
- Navaratna Srinivasa Rajaram (1943 – 2019) - an Indian writer, hindutva-scholar and historian.
- Vasant Purushottam Kale- (1932-2001) Marathi writer. He wrote more than 60 books. His well-known works include Partner, Vapurza, Hi Waat Ekatichi, and Thikri. He was a famous story-teller and had over 1600 stage-shows (कथाकथन) in the theatres.

==== Historians & Archeologists ====
- Anant Sadashiv Altekar (1898–1960) - historian, archaeologist, and numismatist from Maharashtra, India
- Datto Vaman Potdar (Dattatray Vaman Potdar) (1890 - 1979) - Indian historian, writer, orator; Vice-Chancellor of University of Pune during (1961 - 1964); Winner of Padma Bhushan.
- Conjeevaram Hayavadana Rao (1865 – 1946) - an Indian historian, museologist, anthropologist, economist and polyglot. He was a member of the Royal Anthropological Institute, Indian Historical Records Commission and a fellow of the Royal Society of Economics.
- Dattatray Balwant Parasnis (1870 – 1926) - a historian who lived during the British Raj. Conferred the title of Rao Bahadur by the British.
- Sethu Madhav Rao Pagadi (1910 - 1994) - an accomplished historian, an able civil servant, a polyglot and Winner of Padma Bhushan.
- Madhusudan Narhar Deshpande (1920 - 2008) - an art historian, archaeologist and conservator who served as Director General of the Archaeological Survey of India from 1972 to 1978.
- Babasaheb Purandare (1922 - 2021) - an Indian historian and theatre personality from Maharashtra and a Padma Vibhushan awardee.

== Music ==
=== Hindustani classical music ===
- Bal Gandharva (Narayan Shripad Rajhans) (1888 - 1968) - one of the greatest Marathi singers and stage actors. Winner of Sangeet Natak Akademi Award, the highest musical honour in India and the Padma Bhushan award, the third highest civilian award in the Republic of India.
- Krishnarao Phulambrikar (1898 – 1974) (popularly known as Master Krishnarao) - an Indian vocalist, classical musician and composer of Hindustani music. Winner of Padma Bhushan award.
- Sawai Gandharva (Ramachandra Kundgolkar Saunshi) (1886 - 1952) - a popular Hindustani Classical vocalist and Marathi stage actor of the Kirana Gharana. He was the first and foremost disciple of Ustad Abdul Karim Khan and guru of Bharat Ratna laureate Pandit Bhimsen Joshi.
- Bhimsen Joshi (1922 - 2011) - a Hindustani classical vocalist renowned for his contribution to the khayal form of singing, as well as for his popular renditions of devotional music (bhajans and abhangs); Bharat Ratna awardee.
- Vasantrao Deshpande (1920 – 1983) - a Hindustani classical vocalist renowned for his contribution to natya sangeet (musical dramas), particularly his role as "Khansaheb" in Katyar Kaljat Ghusli; Winner of Sangeet Natak Akademi Award.
- Narayanrao Vyas (1902–1984) - a Hindustani musician of Gwalior gharana.
- Vamanrao Deshpande (1907–1990) - an Indian music critic, musicologist and a prolific writer on the subject of Hindustani classical music.
- Gururao Deshpande (1889–1982) - a Hindustani classical vocalist from Karnataka.
- Rahul Deshpande is an Indian classical music singer and actor. Winner of National Film Award for Best Male Playback Singer for Me Vasantrao (2022). He is grandson of famous classical music singer Vasantrao Deshpande

=== Carnatic classical music ===
- Purandara Dasa - a Haridasa, who is widely referred to as the Pitamaha (lit, "father" or the "grandfather") of Carnatic Music.
- Mysore Sadashiva Rao (1800 – 1885) - a notable Indian vocalist and composer of Carnatic music in the traditions of Tyagaraja. He was a member of the court of the king of Mysore, Krishnaraja Wodeyar III.
- Sakha Rama Rao - an Indian musician credited with having re-introduced the south Indian chitravina (or "gotuvadyam") to the concert scene.
- S.V.Narayanaswamy Rao - Founder of Sree Ramaseva Mandali the organiser of Annual Sree Ramanavami Music Festival at Bengaluru was a pious Desastha Madhwa Brahmin. A violinist himself, S.V.N Rao was instrumental in grooming many prominent artistes of today.

== Sports ==
=== Cricket ===
- Rahul Dravid (born 11 January 1973) is former captain of the Indian national cricket team and currently serving as its head coach. He is nicknamed as Mr. Dependable and often referred to as The Wall.

== Military ==
- Gopal Gurunath Bewoor (11 August 1916 – 24 October 1989) - an officer of the Indian Army who served as the 9th Chief of Army Staff. Winner of Padma Bhushan and Param Vishisht Seva Medal
- M. M. Naravane (born 22 April 1960) - an officer of the Indian Army who served as the 28th Chief of Army Staff. Winner of Param Vishisht Seva Medal

== Science and Technology ==
- Dwarkanath Kotnis (1910 - 1949) - Indian physician and one of the five Indian physicians dispatched to China to provide medical assistance during the Second Sino-Japanese War in 1938.
- Bhalchandra Nilkanth Purandare (1911 - 1990) - Indian Gynecologist; Winner of Padma Bhushan.
- Bhaskar Dattatraya Kulkarni (1949 - 2019) - Indian Scientist, Chemical Engineer at National Chemical Laboratory, Pune; Winner of Shanti Swarup Bhatnagar Prize for Science and Technology.

== Mathematics and statistics ==
- Bhaskaracharya II (Bhaskara II) (1114 – 1185) - Indian mathematician and astronomer.
- Pandurang Vasudeo Sukhatme (1911–1997) - Indian statistician; Winner of Padma Bhushan.

== Education ==
- Trimbak Krishna Tope (1914 - 1994) - former Vice Chancellor of University of Mumbai from (1971 - 1977).
- C. D. Deshpande (1912 - 1999) - noted educationist, geographer, author, and teacher.
- T. Gopala Rao (1832 – 1886) - educationist, served as the Principal of Government Arts College, Kumbakonam after William Archer Porter and first inspector of schools under British government.

== Business and Industries ==
- Malhar Sadashiv Parkhe (1912 – 1997) - an Indian industrialist and founder of Parkhe Group.
- Vasantrao Madhavrao Ghatge (1916 – 1986) - an Indian entrepreneur, business magnate, industrialist, and a professor and was the co-founder of Ghatge Patil Transports pvt. Ltd along in the year 1945 based in Kolhapur.
- Bhalchandra Digamber Garware, (fondly referred to as "Abasaheb Garware") (1903 - 1990) - a pioneering industrialist and Founder Chairman of the Garware Group of Industries; Winner of Padma Bhushan.
- Gururaj Deshpande - an Indian American venture capitalist and entrepreneur, who is best known for co-founding the Chelmsford, MA-based internet equipment manufacturer Sycamore Networks, the Deshpande Center for Technological Innovation at MIT and the Deshpande Foundation.
