= Shridhar Swami Nazarekar =

Marathi language Poet from India

- Born: Shridhar Brahmanand Nazarekar; 1658; Nazare, Solapur district, Maharashtra
- Died: 1729 (aged 70–71); Pandharpur, Solapur district, Maharashtra
- Occupation: Poet
- Relatives: Father: Brahmananda Kadke
- Writing career
- Notable works: Harivijaya; RamVijaya; PandavaPratap

Shridhar Brahmanand Nazarekar (CE 1658-1729), popularly known as Shridhar Swami Nazarekar or Shridhar Pandit, was a popular Marathi Akhyanaka (narrative) poet and philosopher who wrote several caritra granthas in the 17th and 18th centuries. Shridhara was a puranik, that is one who recite stories from Puranas. Later he began to compose works himself in a simple devotional style, and were not only extremely popular, but were revered and worshipped like sacred texts.

== Biography ==
Shridhara was born to a Kulkarni belonging to Deshastha Yajurvedi Brahmin (DYB) family in 1658 CE in Nazare a village in Solapur district, Maharashtra state. His father Brahmananda Kadke, was also his guru with some literary works such as Atma Prakash in 1681, a vedanta. It is in the form of Ovi poetry and is divided in 14 chapters. Shridhara added 32 stanzas as a prologue to it. Shridhara was also called as Nazarekar because his father was a Kulkarni at Nazare in Sholapur district, but they hail from Khadki. Later they shifted to Pandharpur from Nazare in his early days of his life. Shridhara turned to literary composer in the middle age. He first composed Harivijaya in 1702, an abridged version of Shrikrishna charita, based on Bhagavata and Padma Purana. Then followed RamVijaya in 1703, an abridged adaptation of Ramayana. Then after a lapse of ten years or so appeared PandavaPratap in 1712, an abridged version of Mahabharata. The last to appear in his series was Shivlilamrut, based mainly on Skanda Purana. All these compositions are written in a simple, chaste style. He had correctly anticipated common man as his reader, and common man has ever been grateful to him for these writings. They not only read but worshipped these compositions like holy scriptures. Shridhar's popularity is quite a phenomenon in Marathi literature. There were many Marathi poets before and after him, who had worked on mythological themes, Mahanubhava poets like Bhaskarabhatta, Borikar and Narendra, Eknath, Mukteshwara ( from whose version of Mahabharata Shridhara himself had borrowed liberally and literally), Raghunath Pandit, Samraj and Nagesh. Moropant alone among them had condensed all the three epics, Ramayana, Mahabharata and the Bhagavata, but his compositions in Āryā metre addressed pandits well versed in Sanskrit, but could not reach the masses. Shridhara did not belong to the category of saint-poets or pandit-poets. And yet he was the only one among them who could reach out so well to the masses. His simple abridged versions in the popular Ovi meter appealed to their taste.

== Literary works ==
Shridhar Swami is famous for composing works in a simple devotional style. His popularity cuts across all castes because of his simplicity of style, narrative power and devotional sentiment. He took known stories from the Ramayana and Mahabharata and narrated them with moral teaching and Vedantic philosophy. The Harivijaya, RamVijaya, Shivlilamrut, PandavaPratap, and the AmbikaUdaya are his major works. His other works include Vedanta-surya, a philosophical text, Panduranga Mahatmya and Venkatesh Mahatmya.

== Bibliography ==
- Lal, Mohan (1992). Encyclopaedia of Indian Literature: Sasay to Zorgot. Sahitya Akademi. ISBN 9788126012213.
