= Raghunath Pandit =

Marathi poet

Raghunath Pandit was a 17th-century Marathi poet, minister and diplomat. He was born in a Deshastha Rigvedi Brahmin (DRB) family of scholars.

Raghunath Pandit was a minister (one of the 8 Ashta Pradhan) and diplomat in the Maratha king Shivaji's court, who assigned him as an envoy to meet Jai Singh I, a senior general of the Mughal emperor Aurangzeb, when he led the Mughal armies into the deccan to subdue Shivaji. For this, he was bestowed the title of Panditrao.

Shivaji also commissioned him to write the Rajya Vyavahara Kosha (Rājavyavahārakośa), a Sanskrit dictionary to translate administrative and legal terms from Persian and Arabic into Sanskrit.

Raghunath Pandit authored Nalopakhyana, an adaptation of the Nala and Damayanti narrative modeled after the Sanskrit Mahakavya tradition and influenced by Shri Harsha’s Naishadhacharita. While the plot is rooted in the Mahabharata, Pandit’s version stands as an independent masterpiece, distinguished by his keen psychological insight, mastery of narrative pacing, and vivid descriptive style.

Marathi poetry went through a phase where text drew heavily on religious mythology and was dominated by language influenced by Sanskrit, a language which few in contemporary times understand. This literature is called Pant-Sahitya. Raghunath Pandit was one of its major practitioners, writing the Nal-Damayanti Swayamwar Akhyan.

Other exponents of Pant-Sahitya were Vaman Pandit (1608–1695), Shridhar Pandit (1658–1729) and Moropant (Paradkar) (1729–1794). Several scholars were experts in this field around the year 1900 but slowly their numbers dwindled. Laxman Ramchand (La Raa) Pangarkar was an authority on Sant-Sahitya and Pant-Sahitya. Tukaram and Ramdas were the last major poets of Sant-Sahitya and Bhakti Parampara. The next phase of Bhakti was marked by Pant-Sahitya. Around this time, other forms of poetry such as Powada, Phatka, Lavani also existed. Starting with Keshavasut in the late 19th century, Marathi poetry made a departure from Pant parampara. It became more modern in outlook, easier to understand, expanded its horizons, and the new brigade of poets was also influenced by English poetry.
