= Niranjan Madhav =

Indian diplomat, poet (1703–1790)

Parasnis Niranjan Madhav

Maratha Empire
- In office 1735–1790
- Monarch: Chhatrapati Shahu
- Preceded by: Bapu

Personal details
- Born: 1703 Satara, Maratha Empire (present-day Maharashtra, India)
- Died: 1790 Pune, Maratha Empire (present-day Maharashtra, India)

Niranjan Madhav also known as Niranjan Madhav Parasnis (1703-1790) was a diplomat and poet, who worked as Parasnis under Peshwa Bajirao I. He was sent on diplomatic assignments to Karnataka and Tamil Nadu by Bajirao I and Balaji Bajirao.

In 1735, Niranjan Madhav was appointed as the Parasnis by Peshwa Bajirao I.

Madhav is remembered for his splendid contribution to the Maratha Empire by way of loyalty, and diplomacy.

== Early life ==
According to Akbharats and the Poona Jagirdar Parasnis collections of Persian despatches from Delhi, Niranjan Madhav was born in 1703 in a prominent Deshastha Rigvedi Brahmin family of Vishvamitra gotra in Satara, Maratha Empire (present-day Maharashtra, India).

== Works ==
Niranjan Madhav was initiated into the mysteries of the spiritual lore and wrote five works, finishing some at Poona and some others at Srirangapattana. He unlocked a temple at Belur Chenna Keshava. Niranjan Madhav composed Subhadra Swayamvara Champu. This akhyana contains prose and poetry, which is a significant contribution to Marathi akhyana.This is a Swayamvar Kavya describing the marriage between Arjuna and Subhadra.

In 1760, Niranjan Madhav composed Jnaneshwar Vijay, on life of Dnyaneshwar.It is based on the work of Namdev and is more a laudatory poem than a biography.

== Bibliography ==
- Gokhale, Balkrishna Govind (1988). Poona in the eighteenth century: an urban history. Oxford University Press. ISBN 9780195621372.
- Iqbal, Dr. Jaquir (2009). Islamic Financial Management, Volume 1. Global Vision Publishing House. ISBN 9788182202214.
- Callewaert, Winand M. (1994). According to Tradition: Hagiographical Writing in India. Otto Harrassowitz Verlag. ISBN 9783447035248.
- Sarkar, Sir Jadunath (1953). Delhi affairs (1761-1788): (News-letters from Parasnis collection). Director of Archives, Government of Bombay.
