= Moropant =

Indian writer (1729–1794)

Moreshwar Ramchandra Paradkar (1729–1794), popularly known in Maharashtra as Moropant or Mayur Pandit, was a Marathi poet who was the last among those classified by Marathi literary scholars as pandit poets. He was born in a Karhade Brahmin family at Panhala. (Mukteshwar, Vaman Pandit, Raghunath Pandit, and Shridhar Pandit were other prominent pandit poets.)

Moropant had planned to write 108 Ramayan-s, but the actual number written by him comes to 94–95. Some of the versions probably cover only a stanza or two or five. He wrote Niroshhth Ramayan, which eschews all consonants of pa-varga. Since labial or oshhthya consonants are absent, it is called Nirishhtha Ramayan. Some versions were dedicated to a single poetic metre, like Vibudhapriya-Ramayan and Panch-chaamara Ramayan..his great-grandson Kapil ramkrushna paradkar stays at Pune at vitthalwadi sinhagad road .he retired from international book depot recently after 55 years of service

== Works ==
He is most famous for his mastery over Arya (आर्या) and Pruthvi (पृथ्वी) chhanda-s. Kekavali was his last major work, which he finished in early 1790s.

The following are some of the works of Moropant:

- Aryabaharat (आर्याभारत) (17,170 Arya couplets, plus two : one quatrain in Shardulvikridit, one in Arya-geeti)
- Marathi Ramayan (रामायण) (16,000 couplets)
- Arya-Kekavali (आर्याकेकावली, in Arya metre; this one should not be confused with his more famous Kekavali)
- Mantrabhagawat (मंत्रभागवत) (3,592 couplets)
- Krushnavijay (कृष्णविजय) (3,669 couplets)
- Harivamsha (हरिवंश) (5,444 couplets)
- Brahmottarakhand (ब्रह्मोत्तरखंड) (1,200 couplets)
- Kekavali (केकावली, 121 quatrains in पृथ्वी, and the last one in Sragdhara; his last major work)
- Samshaya-Ratnamala (संशय-रत्नमाला)
- Satigeet (सतीगीत)
