= Parasnis =

Parasnis or Parasnavis is a title and surname native to the Indian state of Maharashtra and North Karnataka.

Parasnis was a designation of a post who held a high position at the royal courts.

James Laine in his book Shivaji: Hindu King in Islamic India says that to this day, the surname is used by many high-caste Hindus in Maharashtra.

== Etymology ==
The actual title was Parasnavis, which literally means One who writes in Persian.

James Laine says it as the profession as a clerk literate in Persian.

== History ==
=== Parasnis at the royal courts ===
Akbharats and the Poona Jagirdar Parasnis collections of Persian despatches from Delhi describes the Parasnis Jagirdar family of Poona as belonging to Deshastha Rigvedi Brahmins community with Vishvamitra as their family gotra. The family originally served as Kulkarni of Ramdoha in the Shevgaon taluka of Ahmednagar district, who rose in ranking to become Deshmukhs and Jagirdars. One of their ancestors was renowned at the Adilshahi court of Bijapur for his skill in Persian writing. One Bhimrao from the family was the first to become a Parasnis under Shahu I. His son Bapu served as the Persian secretary Peshwa Bajirao I. On Bapu's death in 1735, his paternal uncle Niranjan Madhav succeeded to the post and later became the Peshwa's envoy at the court of Nizam in 1772.

The current Jagirdar Parasnis of Pune is a direct descendant of Bapu Parasnis. Their family mansion stands near the Amruteshwar Temple in Pune.

== Notable people ==
Notable people with the surname include:

- Aba Parasnis, Vedic and Persian scholar of the early 19th century Maharashtra.
- Dattatray Balwant Parasnis, a historian from Maharashtra during British Raj.
- Niranjan Madhav Parasnis, diplomat of Maratha Empire.

== See also ==
- Chitnis
- Kotnis
