= Harivijaya =

HariVijaya is a devotional literature composed by Shridhar Swami Nazarekar (1658–1729), a popular Marathi poet in the 17-18th century. It literally means "Victory to God Hari".
