= Ramavijaya =

Shri Ram Vijaya is a popular devotional literature composed by Shridhar Swami Nazarekar (1658-1729) in Marathi. It literally means 'Victory to Rama, an incarnation of Vishnu'.

== Introduction ==
The "Shri Ramavijaya" is divided into 40 chapters("adhyaya" in Marathi) and is composed of 9147 couplets ("ovis" in Marathi). In 1891, the "Shri Ramvijaya" was retold in the English language and published by Dubhashi&Co, Bombay.

Until the early 20th century, it was common to recite the Ramvijaya in a gathering of women in middle class Marathi speaking families.
