= Shivlilamrut =

Poem by Shridhar Swami Nazarekar

Shivlilamrut is a devotional poem composed by the Marathi poet-saint Shridhar Swami Nazarekar.

It was composed in 1718 AD (Hindu calendar 1640). Shridhar Swami wrote it on the banks of the river Brahma Kamandalu in Baramati in the vicinity of the Kashi Vishveshwar temple. It literally means "The Nectar of Shiva's Play".

It has 14 chapters (adhyaya) and 2453 couplets (ovis in Marathi). Mostly, it is based on BrahmottarKhanda from the Skanda Purana but some parts of it are from Linga Purana and Shiva Purana. It also has a 15th chapter but many are of the opinion that this was added later and not composed by Shridhar Swami.

The 11th chapter (adhyay) is called 'Rudra Adhyay' and is considered the most important as per Shridhar Swami.

The Shivalilamrut talks about the Rudraksha that can be worn as necklaces by worshipers of the God Shiva.
