= Sridhar =

Sridhar is a given name that is also sometimes used as a surname. Notable people with this name include:

- Sridhar (actor), Indian actor in the Kannada film industry
- Anup Sridhar, badminton player
- C. V. Sridhar, screenwriter and film director
- Sridhar, Telugu actor, Muthyala Muggu fame
- H. Sridhar, sound engineer
- Joshua Sridhar, composer of film scores and soundtracks in Tamil cinema
- K. R. Sridhar, engineer, professor, and energy entrepreneur
- M. V. Sridhar, cricketer
- Sridhar Babu, Indian politician and member of the Andhra Pradesh Legislative Assembly
- Sridhar Lagadapati, founder and head of Larsco Entertainment
- Sridhar Rangayan, Indian screenwriter, film director and producer, with a special focus on LGBT subjects
- Sridhar Tayur, American business professor
- Sridhar (choreographer), Indian choreographer
- V. Sridhar, Indian film score and soundtrack composer and lyricist in the Kannada film industry
- Sridhara, ancient Indian mathematician

== See also ==
- Sridhara, also spelled Sridhar or Sreedhar, one of lord Vishnu's thousand names when consort to the Hindu goddess Lakshmi
- Shridhar
