= Kotnis =

Kotnis is the surname found in multiple communities in Maharashtra. It can belong to the Gaud Sarasota Brahmins or .

== People with the surname ==
- Dwarkanath Kotnis, was one of the five Indian physicians dispatched to China to provide medical assistance during the Second Sino-Japanese War in 1938.
- Kamala Kotnis, an Indian actress who played roles in Telugu and hindi movies.
