= Bhanudasa =

Bhanudasa (1448–1513) (also spelled as Bhanudas), was a Hindu sant who brought back the sacred image of the god Vithoba back from Vijayanagara to Pandharpur, its original location. He was Eknath's great-grandfather. As a boy he worshipped the Sun but later came to worship Vithoba. He is the subject of two chapters in the Bhaktavijaya. His Samadhi situated in Solkhambi Mandap (exact right side near entrance) of Vitthal temple at Pandharpur.

The King of Vijayanagar Krishnadevaraya had taken the statue of Lord Vitthal back to Hampi as Pandharpur was an unstable region. The Idol remained at the Vijaya Vitthala Temple until it was later brought back to Pandharpur by Saint Bhanudas after the fall of Vijayanagara to the Deccan Sultanates after Talikota.
