= Shridhar =

Shridhar (Hindi: श्रीधर) is an Indian name. Shri means wealth, and dhara means wear, thus “one who wears wealth.”

== People ==
=== Given name ===
- Shridhar Chillal (born 1937), world record holder for having the longest fingernails on a single hand
- Shridhar Narayan Huddar, the brother of Gopal Mukund Huddar (1902–1981), Indian anti-colonial activist and soldier
- Shridhar Venkatesh Ketkar (1884–1937), Indian scholar
- Shridhar Sathe (1950–2019), professor of food science at Florida State University
- Shridhar Bhaskar Warnekar (1918–2007), Sanskrit scholar born in Nagpur, India
- Shridhar (actor), Indian actor

=== Surname ===
- Agni Shridhar, Indian writer, artist, and mobster
- Neeraj Shridhar, Indian film composer and singer-songwriter
- Arun Shridhar Vaidya (1926–1986), 13th Chief of Army Staff (CoAS) of the Indian Army
- Vibudh Shridhar, North Indian writer and poet
- Narayan Shridhar Bendre (1910–1992), Indian painter

== Other ==
- 13710 Shridhar, a Main-belt Asteroid discovered on August 17, 1998

== See also ==
- Sridhar
