= Balkrishna Govind Gokhale =

Indian American anthropologist and historian (1919–2005)

Balkrishna Govind Gokhale (4 September 1919, in Dwarka – 11 August 2005) was an Indian American anthropologist and historian, specialising in Indian history and society, best remembered for his books Ancient India History and Culture (1952), Indian Thought Through the Ages (1961), and Images of India (1971) on the subject. A graduate of the St. Xavier's College in Mumbai and the University of Bombay, he was a professor of Asian studies at Wake Forest University, and taught at Bowdoin College, Oberlin College, and the University of Washington, Seattle. He has also been widely cited as an expert in the field.
