= Pandav Pratap =

Pandav Pratap is a devotional literature composed by Shridhar Swami Nazarekar (1658-1729), a popular Marathi poet in the 17th-18th centuries.
