= Rajya Vyavahara Kosha =

17th-century Sanskrit administrative lexicon commissioned by Shivaji

Rājavyavahārakośa
- Author: Raghunath Pandit
- Language: Sanskrit
- Genre: Lexicon / Thesaurus
- Publication date: 17th Century

Rajya Vyavahara Kosha (Rājavyavahārakośa) is a 17th-century Sanskrit administrative lexicon compiled during the reign of Shivaji (r. 1674–1680), the founder of the Maratha Empire. The work was authored by Raghunath Pandit, a scholar and minister (one of the Ashta Pradhans) of Shivaji's court and was intended to provide Sanskrit equivalents for Persian and Arabic administrative terminology used in the governance of the Deccan during the late medieval period.

The compilation formed part of a broader effort during Shivaji's reign to promote Sanskrit terminology within state administration and court culture. Persian had long functioned as the principal bureaucratic language across much of the Indian subcontinent under earlier sultanates and the Mughal Empire. The Rajyavyavahārakośa was intended to standardize Sanskrit equivalents for these administrative expressions and facilitate their adoption in Maratha governance.

The dictionary contains approximately 1,344 terms arranged in thematic sections known as vargas ("chapters" or "categories"). These sections cover a wide range of subjects relevant to administration, military organization, economic activity, and record-keeping in the Maratha state.

== Structure ==
The Rajyavyavahārakośa is divided into ten thematic chapters (vargas), each dealing with a particular aspect of governance and administration.

1. Rājya-varga Terms relating to the king, royal authority, and courtly functions.
2. Kāryasthāna-varga Terms relating to state offices, administrative departments, and bureaucratic functions.
3. Bhōgya-varga Vocabulary associated with consumption, provisions, and everyday material life.
4. Śastra-varga Terms relating to weapons, armaments, and arsenals.
5. Chaturaṅga-varga Terms relating to the four traditional divisions of the army: infantry, cavalry, chariots, and elephants.
6. Sāmanta-varga Terms referring to nobles, feudatories, ministers, and senior military commanders.
7. Durg-varga Terms relating to forts, fortifications, and defensive structures.
8. Lēkhana-varga Terms related to writing, correspondence, and record-keeping.
9. Jānapada-varga Vocabulary relating to rural administration, agriculture, and village governance.
10. Paṇya-varga Terms connected with commerce, trade, and economic transactions.

== Historical significance ==
Historians have interpreted the Rajyavyavahārakośa as part of a broader attempt under Shivaji to reshape the cultural and administrative identity of the emerging Maratha state. By providing Sanskrit equivalents for Persian bureaucratic terminology, the lexicon symbolized an effort to reduce reliance on Persian administrative conventions inherited from earlier Indo-Islamic polities.

The introduction of the Rājavyavahārakośa in 1674 triggered a documented "Linguistic Purge" in Maratha administration, systematically replacing Persian and Arabic terms with Sanskrit equivalents. According to the quantitative analysis by historian V. K. Rajwade, Persian loanwords plummeted from approximately 86% in pre-1674 documents to just 37.3% by 1677, with usage eventually dropping below 10% during the Peshwa era. This shift was a deliberate act of "Sanskritization" intended to establish a distinct Hindu political identity, as evidenced by the renaming of the Ashta Pradhan (Council of Eight) cabinet titles.

== Authorship ==
The work is traditionally attributed to Raghunath Pandit (Raghunātha Paṇḍita), a Sanskrit scholar and minister in Shivaji's administration. He is believed to have compiled the dictionary under royal patronage as part of efforts to codify administrative terminology suitable for the newly established Maratha court.

== See also ==
- Shivaji
- Maratha Empire
- Persian language in South Asia
