= Ovi (poetry) =

Metre used in Indian Marathi poems

Ovee (ovee, literally "strung together"), also spelled owi or owee, is a poetic metre used in Marathi poems for "rhythmic prose", generally used in narrative poems. A poem using this metre is also called an ovee. Ovee is among the "oldest Marathi song genres still performed today". It has been in use since the 13th century in written poetry; however, oral traditions of women's ovee pre-date the literary ovee. While literary ovee is used by the Varkari saints in bhakti (devotional) literature, women's ovee is passed via the oral tradition through generations of women, who sing them while working or for pleasure.

== Forms and origins ==
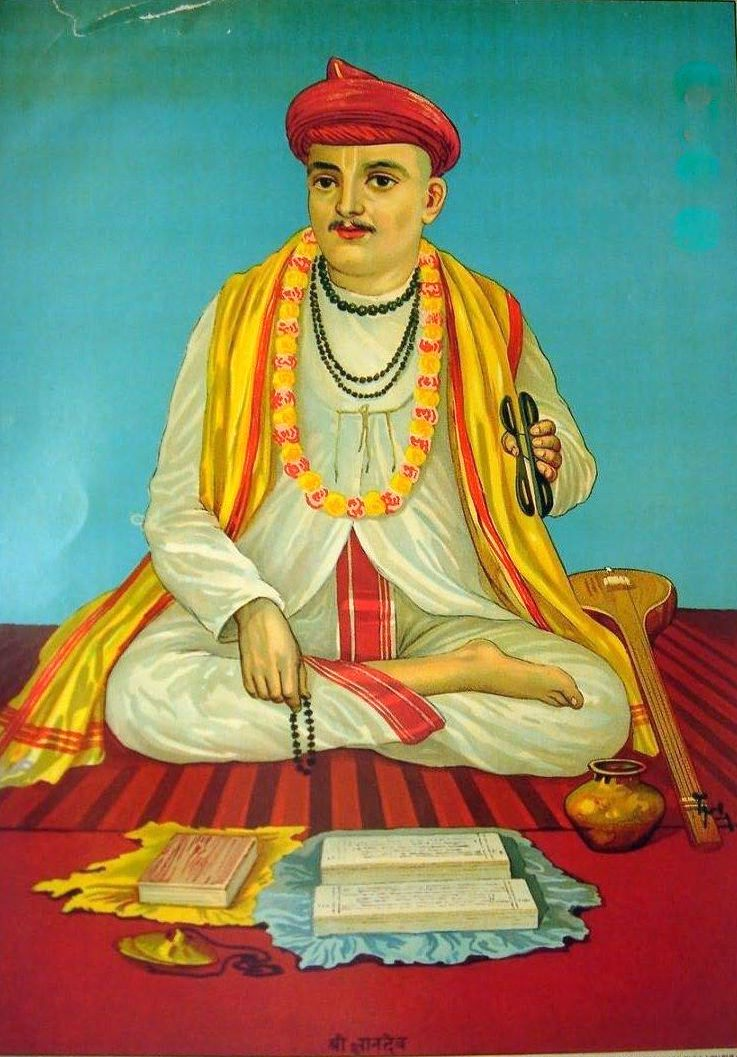
Dnyaneshwaar was the first to use ovee in literature.

Two forms of ovee are popular today: the granthik (literary) ovee and the women's ovee. The literary ovee is sung without tala (rhythm) by a kirtankar in a kirtan, a devotional call-and-response chanting form. This is generally used for ovees of saints like Dnyaneshwar, Eknath and Namdev. The women's ovee is sung with tala, when the women gather for work or pleasure.

The ovee metre originated in literature with the Varkari saint, Dnyaneshwar (1275–1296). Both his magnum opuses Dnyaneshwari and Amrutanubhav are composed in ovee meter. It is one of the two popular poetry metres used by Varkari saints, the other being abhanga – attributed to the saint, Tukaram (1577–1650). While ovee is used for narrative poems, abhanga meter is used for lyrical poems and devotional poems.

The ovee metre is believed to be existed in folk song tradition even before Dnyaneshwar, which the saint adopted for his literary works. Though the ovee tradition pre-dates the Varkari bhakti tradition, there is little record of contents of early ovees. Women's ovees have been passed from generation to generation only through oral means.

== Women's ovee ==
ovee is thought to be in the rhythm of songs sung by women on the grinding stone (jata). The ovee is sung while women use the mortar and pestle or the rahat (a manual water wheel) to pull water from the well. The women's ovees are "protest songs more than work songs" — complaints about the hard work, unhappy marriages and "despotic husbands". They contain sarcasm of the patriarchal society. They also contain elements of bhakti (devotion), where the singer implores God to save her from these bondages.

== Literary ovee ==
An ovee poem has couplets (called kadva or ovee itself). Each couplet is generally divided into four charan (parts/lines). The first three charans are rhymed and have same number of matras (instants) composed of six or eight letters (vary from eight to ten syllables), while the fourth is "open" (unrhymed with the rest), shorter with fewer matras and generally has four letters (vary from four to six syllables). For example, the Dnyaneshwari has eight matras in the first three charans and four to six in the last charan. It is thus called a couplet of three and a half charans. In contrast, an abhanga has four charans with eight letters each.

Example of an ovee from Dnyaneshwari:

Devā Tūchi Gaṇeshū |
Sakalārthamatiprakāshū |
Mhaṇe Nivṛtti Dāsū |
Avadhārijojē ||2||

देवा तूंचि गणेशु |
सकलमति प्रकाशु |
म्हणे निवृत्ति दासु |
अवधारिजो जी ||2||

The ovee was used by another saint, Eknath (1533–1599), too; however, while Dnyaneshwar's ovee has three and a half parts, Ekanath's ovee has four and a half parts. Dnyaneshwar's ovee is considered one of the foremost compositions in the ovee metre. The abhanga metre is said to have originated from Dnyaneshwar's ovee metre.

The abhanga is often considered as a form of the ovee. Dilip Chitre considers the abhanga tradition is strongly influenced by the women's ovee. S. G. Tulpule says the abhanga "is nothing but a prolongation of the original ovee, its name signifying continuity of the essential ovee units". Janabai's abhangas borrow themes of women's household chores of grinding and pounding from the women's ovee tradition and asks Vithoba, the patron god of the Varkari tradition, to help her in her chores.
