= Marathi language =

Indo-Aryan language of India

Marathi
- मराठी, 𑘦𑘨𑘰𑘙𑘲 (Marāṭhī)
- The word Marāṭhī in Devanagari
- Pronunciation: Marathi: [məˈɾaːʈʰiː] English: /məˈrɑːti/
- Native to: India
- Region: Western India and the Northern Deccan Plateau: Maharashtra; Goa (minority); Gujarat (minority in Vadodara and Surat); Karnataka (minority in Belagavi and Bidar); Dadra and Nagar Haveli and Daman and Diu (minority); Sindh (minority in Karachi)
- Ethnicity: Marathi
- Speakers: L1: 83 million (2011); L2: 16 million (2011)
- Language family: Indo-European: Indo-Iranian; Indo-Aryan; Southern; Marathi–Konkani; Marathi
- Early form: Maharashtri Prakrit
- Standard forms: Standard Marathi
- Dialects: Varhadi (major); Zadi Boli; Southern Indian Marathi (Thanjavur Marathi, Kerala Marathi); East Indian Marathi; Judeo-Marathi
- Writing system: Devanagari (official) (Marathi alphabet); Modi (historical); Goykanadi (historical, sometimes); Kadamba (historical); Nagari (historical); Devanagari Braille
- Signed forms: Indian Signing System

Official status
- Official language in: India: Maharashtra; Goa (additional)
- Regulated by: Ministry of Marathi Language and various other institutions

Language codes
- ISO 639-1: mr
- ISO 639-2: mar
- ISO 639-3: Either: mar – Modern Marathi omr – Old Marathi
- Glottolog: mara1378 Modern Marathi oldm1244 Old Marathi
- Linguasphere: 59-AAF-o
- Regions where Marathi is the language of the majority or plurality Regions where Marathi is the language of a significant minority

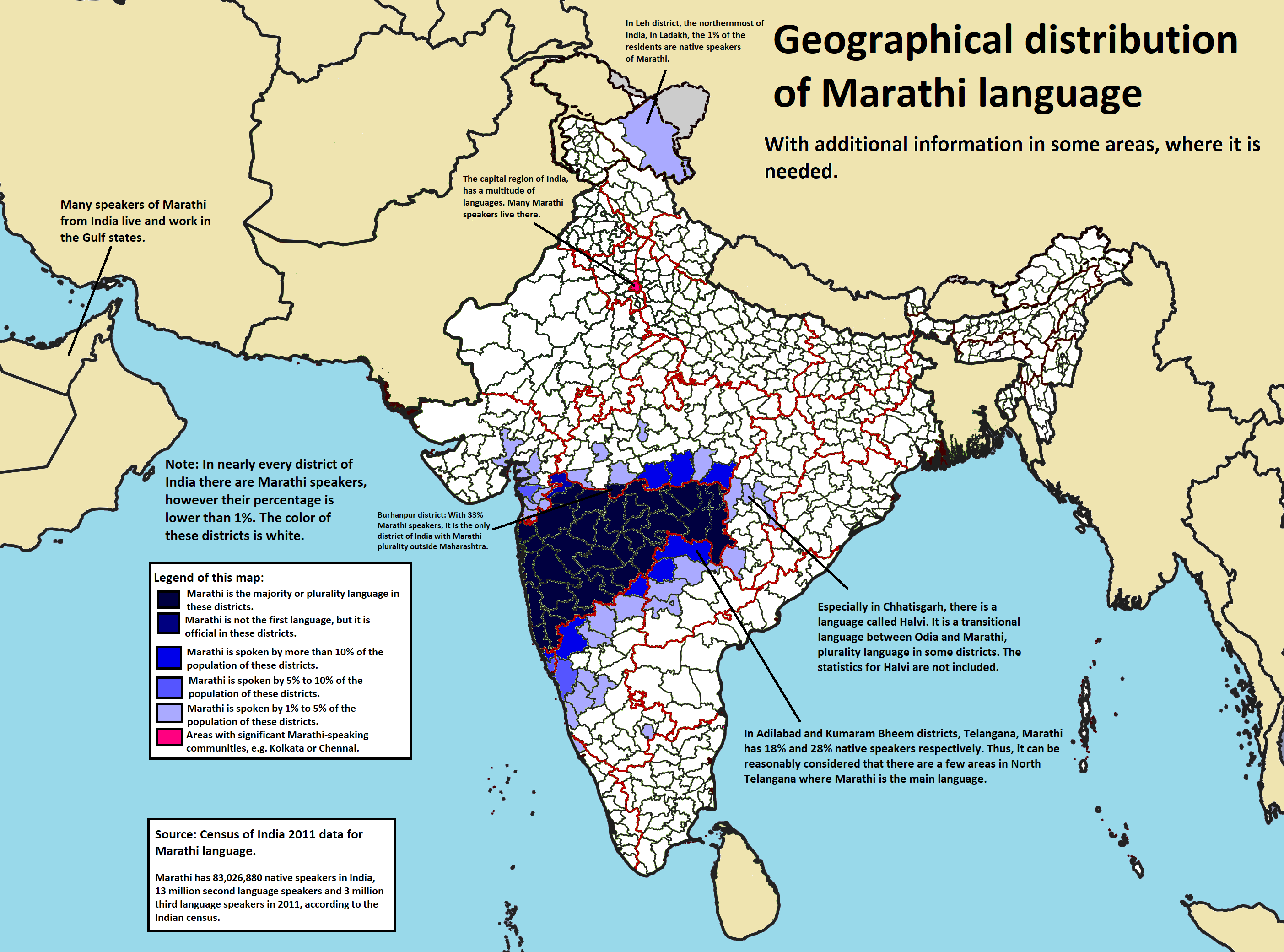
- Map of Marathi language in India (district-wise). Darker shades imply a greater percentage of native speakers of Marathi in each district.

Marathi (/məˈrɑːti/ mə-RAH-tee; मराठी, 𑘦𑘨𑘰𑘙𑘲, Marāṭhī, pronounced [məˈɾaːʈʰiː]) is an Indo-Aryan language of the Indo-Iranian branch of the Indo-European language family, predominantly spoken by the Marathi people in the Indian state of Maharashtra. It is also widely spoken in Goa and the territory of Dadra and Nagar Haveli and Daman and Diu. A Marathi-speaking community also exists in Karachi, Pakistan. It is the official language of Maharashtra, and an additional official language in the state of Goa.

Derived from Maharashtri Prakrit, it is one of the 22 scheduled languages of India, with 83 million speakers as of 2011. Marathi ranks 15th in the list of languages with the most native speakers in the world. Marathi has the third largest number of native speakers in India, after Hindustani (Hindi-Urdu) and Bengali. Marathi has some of the oldest literature of all modern Indian languages. The major dialects of Marathi are Standard Marathi and the Varhadi Marathi. Marathi was designated as a classical language by the Government of India in October 2024.

Marathi distinguishes inclusive and exclusive forms of 'we' and possesses three genders: masculine, feminine, and neuter. Its phonology contrasts apico-alveolar with alveopalatal affricates and alveolar with retroflex laterals ([l] and [ɭ] (Marathi letters ल and ळ respectively).

== History ==
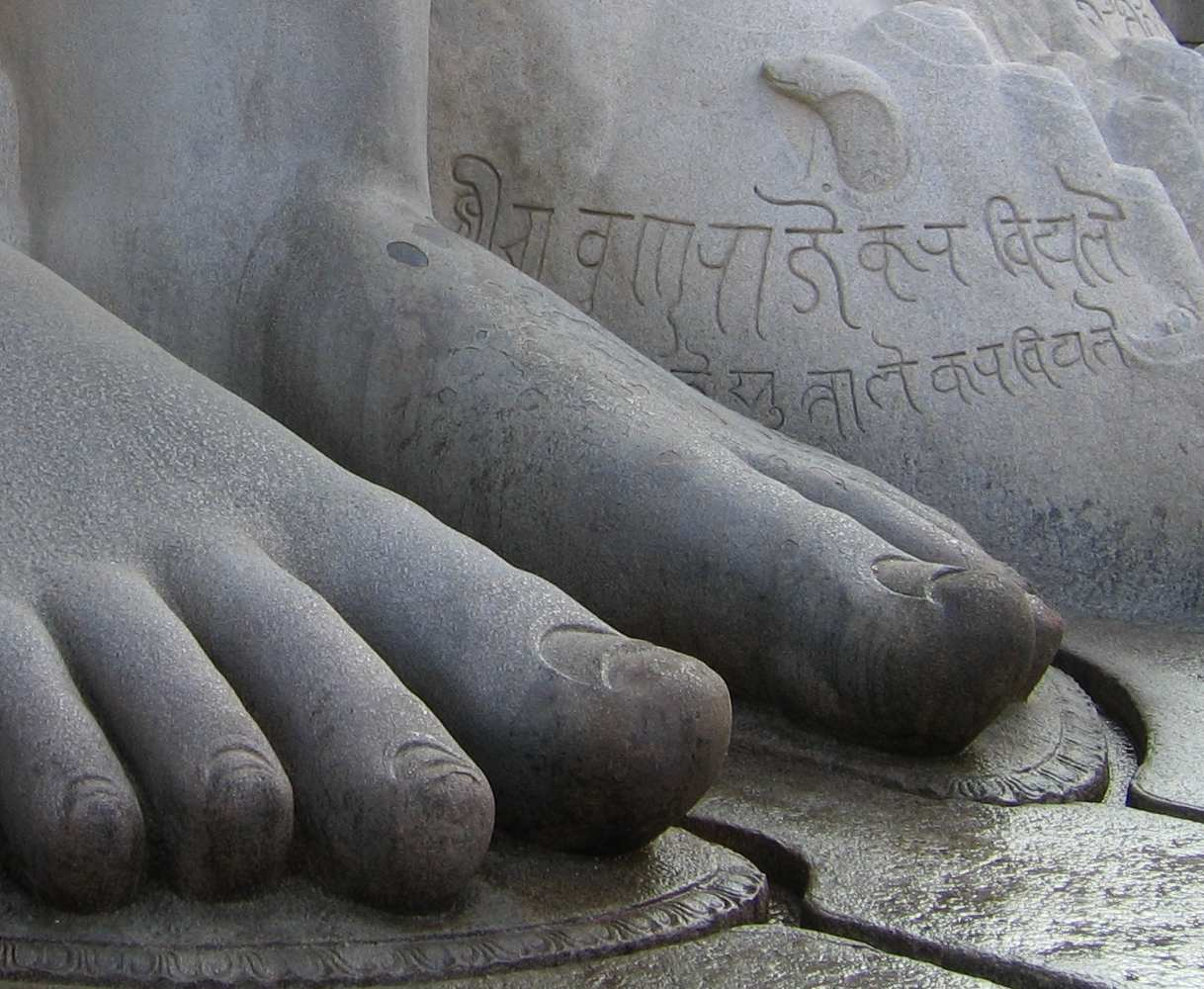
981 CE, Oldest Maharashtri Prakrit inscription at the foot of Bahubali statue at Shravanabelagola Jain temple, Karnataka

Modern Indo-Aryan languages, including Marathi, that belong to the Indo-Aryan language family are derived from Prakrits via Apabhraṃśa. Marathi is one of several languages that further descend from Maharashtri Prakrit. Further changes led to the formation of Apabhraṃśa, followed by Old Marathi. However, this is challenged by Bloch (1970), who states that Apabhraṃśa was formed after Marathi had already separated from the Middle Indo-Aryan dialect. Marathi, a derivative of Maharashtri, is probably first attested in a 739 CE copper-plate inscription found in Satara. Several inscriptions dated to the second half of the 11th century feature Marathi, which is usually appended to Sanskrit or Kannada in these inscriptions.

The earliest Marathi-only inscriptions are the ones issued during the Shilahara rule, including a c. 1012 CE stone inscription from Akshi taluka of Raigad district and a 1060 or 1086 CE copper-plate inscription from Dive that records a land grant (agrahara) to a Brahmin. A 2-line 1118 CE Prakrit inscription at Shravanabelagola records a grant by the Hoysalas. These inscriptions suggest that Prakrit was a standard written language by the 12th century. However, after the Gaha Sattasai, there is no record of any literature produced in Marathi until the late 13th century. The 11th-century Svetambara Jain polymath Acharya Hemchandra, the grammarian of Maharashtri Prakrit, played a significant role in the preservation and study of Maharashtri Prakrit. In his grammatical treatise, the Siddha-Hema-Śabdānuśāsana, Hemachandra systematically described and laid down rules for several Middle Indo-Aryan languages, including Maharashtri Prakrit, which was one of the principal literary Prakrits of ancient India. His work remain the most important source for modern scholars studying the grammar, vocabulary, and literary traditions of Maharashtri Prakrit and its influence on later Indo-Aryan languages. He is also revered as the Father of Gujarati language.

=== Jain origins ===
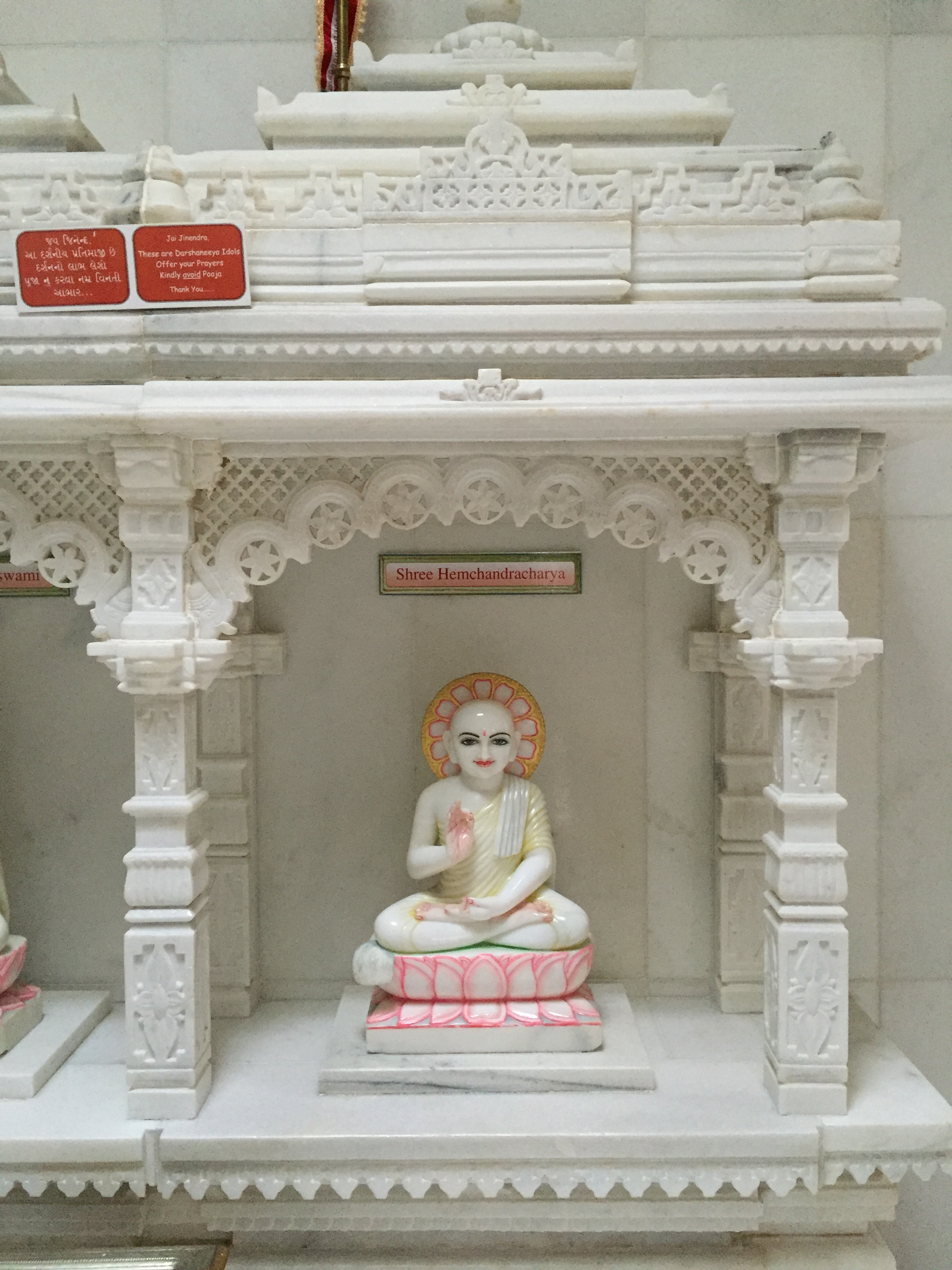
Idol of Hemchandra Acharya at a Jain temple in New Jersey

Paumachariyam from around 100 CE, which was written by Acharya Vimalsuri is the earliest known Jain version of the Ramayana and the oldest work of literature written in Maharashtri Prakrit, indicating ancient links of Jainism with Maharashtri Prakrit. Jain authors formed the oldest non-Varkari streams of medieval Marathi literature. Their writings were mainly religious, ethical and didactic, often adapting Jain narrative traditions from Sanskrit, Prakrit and Apabhramsha into regional literary expression. Jain literary activity in Maharashtra was connected with the wider presence of Jain communities in the Deccan and Konkan during the early and later medieval periods. Medieval Jain Marathi works generally emphasised themes such as ahimsa, karma, Jain vegetarianism, soul awareness, renunciation, right conduct and spiritual discipline. Jain poets also contributed to narrative and moral literature, including religious biographies of Tirthankars, stories and instructional compositions. The Sahitya Akademi history of Marathi literature records Jain contributions as part of the development of classical Marathi literature.

One later medieval Jain author associated with Marathi writing was Gunakirti, who is credited with the Marathi text Dharmamrita. Such works show that Jain scholars used Marathi not only for literary expression but also for communicating religious and ethical teachings to lay communities.

=== Yadava period ===
After 1187 CE, the use of Marathi grew substantially in the inscriptions of the Yadava kings, who earlier used Kannada and Sanskrit in their inscriptions. Marathi became the dominant language of epigraphy during the last half century of the dynasty's rule (14th century), and may have been a result of the Yadavas' attempts to connect with their Marathi-speaking subjects and to distinguish themselves from the Kannada-speaking Hoysalas.

=== Medieval Bhakti Movement and Deccan Sultanate period ===
The 13th century Varkari saint Dnyaneshwar (1275–1296) wrote a treatise in Marathi on Bhagawat Gita popularly called Dnyaneshwari and Amrutanubhava.

The 16th century saint-poet Eknath (1528–1599) is well known for composing the Eknāthī Bhāgavat, a commentary on Bhagavat Purana and the devotional songs called Bharud. Mukteshwar translated the Mahabharata into Marathi; Tukaram (1608–1649) transformed Marathi into a rich literary language. His poetry contained his inspirations. Tukaram wrote over 3000 abhangs or devotional songs. Manmathswamy(1561–1631) wrote a large volume of poetry and literature in Marathi. The Shivparv Ambhag composed by him is still read with interest by Veerashaiva people of Marathwada. Apart from this, the Pararamrhasya, a spiritual book composed by him on Shatsthalsiddhanta, is also recited.

Marathi was widely used during the Sultanate period (1350-1670s). Although the rulers were Muslims, the local feudal landlords and the revenue collectors were Hindus and so was the majority of the population. To simplify administration and revenue collection, the sultans promoted use of Marathi in official documents. However, the Marathi language from the era is heavily Persianised in its vocabulary. The Persian influence continues to this day with many Persian derived words used in everyday speech such as bāg (Garden), kārkhānā (factory), shahar (city), bāzār (market), dukān (shop), hushār (clever), kāḡaḏ (paper), khurchi (chair), jamin (land), jāhirāt (advertisement), and hazār (thousand) Marathi also became language of administration during the Ahmadnagar Sultanate. Adilshahi of Bijapur also used Marathi for administration and record keeping.

=== Maratha Empire ===
Marathi gained prominence with the rise of the Maratha Kingdom beginning with the reign of Shivaji Bhonsale. In his court, Shivaji replaced Persian, the common courtly language in the region, with Marathi. The Marathi language used in administrative documents also became less Persianised. Whereas in 1630, 80% of the vocabulary was Persian, it dropped to 37% by 1677. His reign stimulated the deployment of Marathi as a tool of systematic description and understanding. Shivaji Maharaj commissioned one of his officials, Balaji Avaji Chitnis, to make a comprehensive lexicon to replace Persian and Arabic terms with their Sanskrit equivalents. This led to production of 'Rājavyavahārakośa', the thesaurus of state usage in 1677.

Subsequent Maratha rulers extended the confederacy. These excursions by the Marathas helped to spread Marathi over broader geographical regions. This period also saw the use of Marathi in transactions involving land and other business. Documents from this period, therefore, give a better picture of the life of common people. There are a number of Bakhars (journals or narratives of historical events) written in Marathi and Modi script from this period.

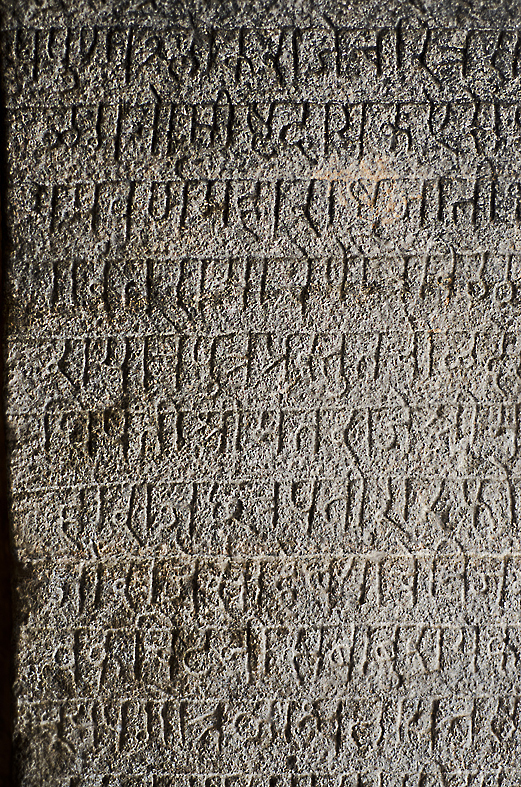
Marathi inscription inside Brihadisvara temple complex, Thanjavur

In the 18th century during Peshwa rule, some well-known works such as Yatharthadeepika by Vaman Pandit, Naladamayanti Swayamvara by Raghunath Pandit, Pandava Pratap, Harivijay, Ramvijay by Shridhar Pandit and Mahabharata by Moropant were produced. Krishnadayarnava and Sridhar were poets during the Peshwa period. New literary forms were successfully experimented with during the period and classical styles were revived, especially the Mahakavya and Prabandha forms. The most important hagiographies of Varkari Bhakti saints were written by Mahipati in the 18th century. Other well known literary scholars of the 17th century were Mukteshwar and Shridhar. Mukteshwar was the grandson of Eknath and is the most distinguished poet in the Ovi meter. He is most known for translating the Mahabharata and the Ramayana in Marathi but only a part of the Mahabharata translation is available and the entire Ramayana translation is lost. Shridhar Kulkarni came from the Pandharpur area and his works are said to have superseded the Sanskrit epics to a certain extent. This period also saw the development of Powada (ballads sung in honour of warriors), and Lavani (romantic songs presented with dance and instruments like tabla). Major poet composers of Powada and Lavani songs of the 17th and the 18th century were Anant Phandi, Ram Joshi and Honaji Bala.

=== British colonial period ===
The British colonial period starting in early 1800s saw standardisation of Marathi grammar through the efforts of the Christian missionary William Carey. Carey's dictionary had fewer entries and Marathi words were in Devanagari. Translations of the Bible were the first books to be printed in Marathi. These translations by William Carey, the American Marathi mission and the Scottish missionaries led to the development of a peculiar pidginised Marathi called "Missionary Marathi" in the early 1800s. The most comprehensive Marathi-English dictionary was compiled by Captain James Thomas Molesworth and Major Thomas Candy in 1831. The book is still in print nearly two centuries after its publication. The colonial authorities also worked on standardising Marathi under the leadership of Molesworth and Candy. They consulted Brahmins of Pune for this task and adopted the Sanskrit dominated dialect spoken by the elite in the city as the standard dialect for Marathi.

The first Marathi translation of the New Testament was published in 1811 by the Serampore press of William Carey. The first Marathi newspaper called Durpan was started by Balshastri Jambhekar in 1832. Newspapers provided a platform for sharing literary views, and many books on social reforms were written. The First Marathi periodical Dirghadarshan was started in 1840. The Marathi language flourished, as Marathi drama gained popularity. Musicals known as Sangeet Natak also evolved. Keshavasut, the father of modern Marathi poetry published his first poem in 1885.

The late-19th century in Maharashtra saw the rise of essayist Vishnushastri Chiplunkar with his periodical, Nibandhmala that had essays that criticised social reformers like Phule and Gopal Hari Deshmukh. He also founded the popular Marathi periodical of that era called Kesari in 1881. Later under the editorship of Lokmanya Tilak, the newspaper was instrumental in spreading Tilak's nationalist and social views. Phule and Deshmukh also started their periodicals, Deenbandhu and Prabhakar, that criticised the prevailing Hindu culture of the day. The 19th century and early 20th century saw several books published on Marathi grammar. Notable grammarians of this period were Tarkhadkar, A.K.Kher, Moro Keshav Damle, and R.Joshi.

The first half of the 20th century was marked by new enthusiasm in literary pursuits, and socio-political activism helped achieve major milestones in Marathi literature, drama, music and film. Modern Marathi prose flourished: for example, N.C. Kelkar's biographical writings, novels of Hari Narayan Apte, Narayan Sitaram Phadke and V. S. Khandekar, Vinayak Damodar Savarkar's nationalist literature and plays of Mama Varerkar and Kirloskar. In folk arts, Patthe Bapurao wrote many lavani songs during the late colonial period.

=== Marathi since Indian independence in 1947 ===
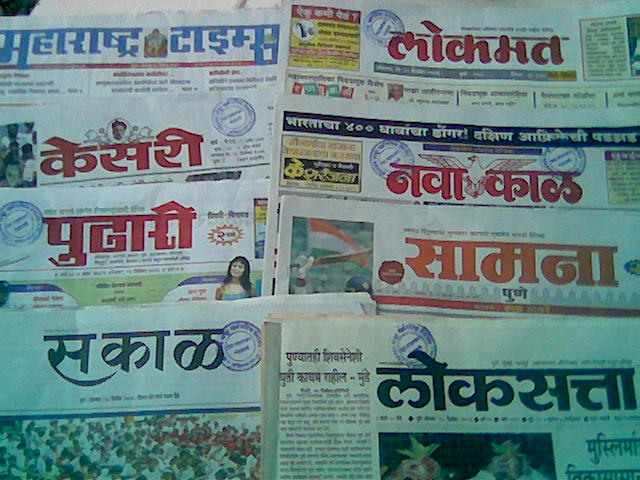
Marathi language newspapers at a newsstand in Mumbai, 2006

After Indian independence, Marathi was accorded the status of a scheduled language on the national level. In 1956, the then Bombay state was reorganised, which brought most Marathi and Gujarati speaking areas under one state. Further re-organisation of the Bombay state on 1 May 1960, created the Marathi speaking Maharashtra and Gujarati speaking Gujarat state respectively. With state and cultural protection, Marathi made great strides by the 1990s. A literary event called Akhil Bharatiya Marathi Sahitya Sammelan (All-India Marathi Literature Meet) is held every year. In addition, the Akhil Bharatiya Marathi Natya Sammelan (All-India Marathi Theatre Convention) is also held annually. Both events are very popular among Marathi speakers.

Notable works in Marathi in the latter half of the 20th century include Khandekar's Yayati, which won him the Jnanpith Award. Also Vijay Tendulkar's plays in Marathi have earned him a reputation beyond Maharashtra. P.L. Deshpande (popularly known as PuLa), Vishnu Vaman Shirwadkar, P.K. Atre, Prabodhankar Thackeray and Vishwas Patil are known for their writings in Marathi in the fields of drama, comedy and social commentary. Bashir Momin Kavathekar wrote Lavani's and folk songs for Tamasha artists.

In 1958 the term "Dalit literature" was used for the first time, when the first conference of Maharashtra Dalit Sahitya Sangha (Maharashtra Dalit Literature Society) was held at Mumbai, a movement inspired by 19th century social reformer, Jyotiba Phule and eminent dalit leader, Dr. Bhimrao Ambedkar. Baburao Bagul (1930–2008) was a pioneer of Dalit writings in Marathi. His first collection of stories, Jevha Mi Jat Chorali (जेव्हा मी जात चोरली, "When I Stole My Caste"), published in 1963, created a stir in Marathi literature with its passionate depiction of a cruel society and thus brought in new momentum to Dalit literature in Marathi. Gradually with other writers like Namdeo Dhasal (who founded Dalit Panther), these Dalit writings paved way for the strengthening of Dalit movement. Notable Dalit authors writing in Marathi include Arun Kamble, Shantabai Kamble, Raja Dhale, Namdev Dhasal, Daya Pawar, Annabhau Sathe, Laxman Mane, Laxman Gaikwad, Sharankumar Limbale, Bhau Panchbhai, Kishor Shantabai Kale, Narendra Jadhav, Keshav Meshram, Urmila Pawar, Vinay Dharwadkar, Gangadhar Pantawane, Kumud Pawde and Jyoti Lanjewar.

In recent decades there has been a trend among Marathi speaking parents of all social classes in major urban areas of sending their children to English medium schools. There is some concern that this may lead to the marginalisation of the language.

== Geographic distribution ==
Marathi is primarily spoken in Maharashtra, with 68% of the State's population as their mother tongue, and some parts of neighbouring states of Gujarat (majorly in Vadodara, and among a small number of population in Surat), Madhya Pradesh (in the districts of Burhanpur, Betul, Chhindwara and Balaghat), Goa, Chhattisgarh, Tamil Nadu (in Thanjavur) and Karnataka (in the districts of Belagavi, Karwar, Bagalkote, Vijayapura, Kalaburagi and Bidar), Telangana, union-territories of Daman and Diu and Dadra and Nagar Haveli. The former Maratha ruled cities of Baroda, Indore, Gwalior, Jabalpur, and Tanjore have had sizeable Marathi-speaking populations for centuries. Marathi is also spoken by Maharashtrian migrants to other parts of India and overseas. For instance, the people from western India who emigrated to Mauritius in the early 19th century also speak Marathi.

There were 83 million native Marathi speakers in India, according to the 2011 census, making it the third most spoken native language after Hindi and Bengali. Native Marathi speakers form 6.86% of India's population. Native speakers of Marathi formed 68% of the population in Maharashtra, 10.89% in Goa, 7.01% in Dadra and Nagar Haveli, 4.53% in Daman and Diu, 3.38% in Karnataka, 1.7% in Madhya Pradesh, and 1.52% in Gujarat.

=== International ===
The following table is a list of the geographic distribution of Marathi speakers as it appears in the 2019 edition of Ethnologue, a language reference published by SIL International, which is based in the United States.

International geographic distribution as per Ethnologue.
Country	Speaker population	Notes
Australia	22,300	2021 census
Canada	19,600	2021 census
Oman	14,000	2020
Israel	11,000	Leclerc 2018a
Mauritius	17,000	Leclerc 2018c
New Zealand	4,770	2018 census
UK	11,600	2021 census
USA	147,000	2021 census

== Status ==
Marathi is the official language of Maharashtra and additional official language in the state of Goa. In Goa, Konkani is the sole official language; however, Marathi may also be used for any or all official purposes in case any request is received in Marathi. Marathi is included among the languages that are part of the Eighth Schedule of the Constitution of India, thus granting it the status of a "scheduled language". The Government of Maharashtra has applied to the Ministry of Culture to grant classical language status to Marathi language, which was approved by the Government of India on 3 October 2024.

The contemporary grammatical rules described by Maharashtra Sahitya Parishad and endorsed by the Government of Maharashtra are supposed to take precedence in standard written Marathi. Traditions of Marathi Linguistics and the above-mentioned rules give special status to tatsamas, words adapted from Sanskrit. This special status expects the rules for tatsamas to be followed as in Sanskrit. This practice provides Marathi with a large corpus of Sanskrit words to cope with the demands of new technical words whenever needed. Currently there are many different dialects spoken across India for example, Konkani,Mumbaikar etc.

In addition to all universities in Maharashtra, Maharaja Sayajirao University of Baroda in Vadodara, Osmania University in Hyderabad, Karnataka University in Dharwad, Gulbarga University in Kalaburagi, Devi Ahilya University in Indore and Goa University in Goa have special departments for higher studies in Marathi linguistics. Jawaharlal Nehru University (New Delhi) has announced plans to establish a special department for Marathi.

Marathi Day is celebrated on 27 February, the birthday of the poet Kusumagraj (Vishnu Vaman Shirwadkar).

== Dialects ==
Standard Marathi is based on dialects used by academics and the print media.

Indic scholars distinguish 42 dialects of spoken Marathi. Dialects bordering other major language areas have many properties in common with those languages, further differentiating them from standard spoken Marathi. The bulk of the variation within these dialects is primarily lexical and phonological (e.g. accent placement and pronunciation). Although the number of dialects is considerable, the degree of intelligibility within these dialects is relatively high.

=== Varhadi ===
Varhadi (Varhādi) (वऱ्हाडि) or Vaidarbhi (वैदर्भि) is spoken in the Western Vidarbha region of Maharashtra. In Marathi, the retroflex lateral approximant ḷ [ɭ] is common, while sometimes in the Varhadii dialect, it corresponds to the palatal approximant y (IPA: [j]), making this dialect quite distinct. Such phonetic shifts are common in spoken Marathi and, as such, the spoken dialects vary from one region of Maharashtra to another.

=== Zadi Boli ===
Zaadi Boli or Zhaadiboli (झाडिबोलि) is spoken in Zaadipranta (a forest rich region) of far eastern Maharashtra or eastern Vidarbha or western-central Gondwana comprising Gondia, Bhandara, Chandrapur, Gadchiroli and some parts of Nagpur of Maharashtra.

Zaadi Boli Sahitya Mandal and many literary figures are working for the conservation of this dialect of Marathi.

=== Southern Indian Marathi ===
Thanjavur Marathi तञ्जावूर् मराठी, Namadeva Shimpi Marathi, Arey Marathi (Telangana), Kasaragod (north Kerala) and Bhavsar Marathi are some of the dialects of Marathi spoken by many descendants of Maharashtrians who migrated to Southern India. These dialects retain the 17th-century basic form of Marathi and have been considerably influenced by the Dravidian languages after the migration. These dialects have speakers in various parts of Tamil Nadu, Andhra Pradesh and Karnataka.

=== Other ===
- Thanjavur Marathi, spoken in Tanjore, Tamil Nadu
- Judæo-Marathi, spoken by the Bene Israel Jews
- East Indian Marathi, spoken by the Indian Christian East Indian ethno-religious group

Other Marathi–Konkani languages and dialects spoken in Maharashtra include Maharashtrian Konkani, Malvani, Sangameshwari, Agri, Andh, Warli, Vadvali and Samavedi.

== Writing systems ==
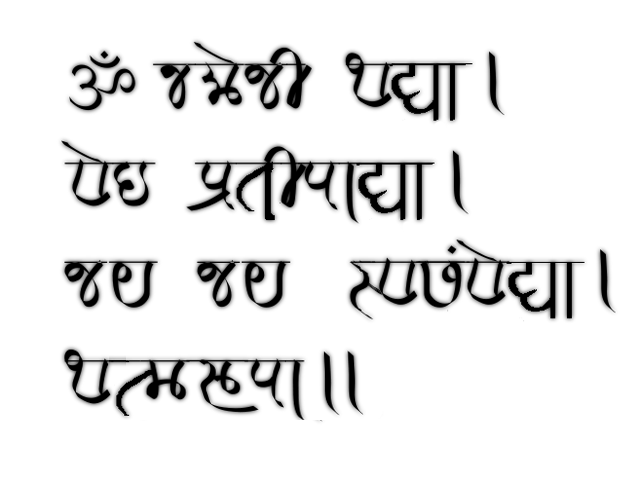
Modi script was used to write Marathi.

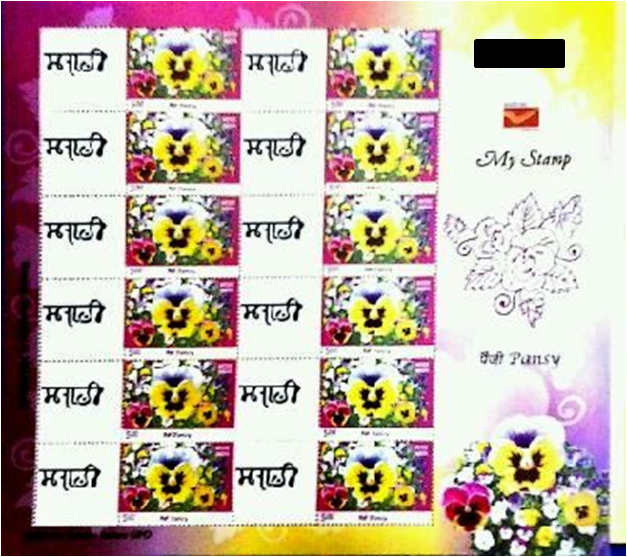
An effort to conserve the "Modi Script" under India Post's My Stamp scheme. Here, the word 'Marathi' is printed in the "Modi Script".

The Kadamba script and its variants have been historically used to write Marathi in the form of inscriptions on stones and copper plates. The Marathi variant of Devanagari, called Balbodh, is similar to the Hindi Devanagari alphabet except for its use for certain words. Some words in Marathi preserve the schwa, which has been omitted in other languages which use Devanagari. For example, the word 'रंग' (colour) is pronounced as 'ranga' in Marathi & 'rang' in other languages using Devanagari, and 'खरं' (true), despite the anuswara, is pronounced as 'khara'. The anuswara in this case is used to avoid schwa deletion in pronunciation; most other languages using Devanagari show schwa deletion in pronunciation despite the presence of schwa in the written spelling. From the 13th century until the beginning of British rule in the 19th century, Marathi was written in the Modi script for administrative purposes but in Devanagari for literature. Since 1950 it has been written in the Balbodh style of Devanagari. Except for Father Thomas Stephens' Krista Purana in the Latin script in the 1600s, Marathi has mainly been printed in Devanagari because William Carey, the pioneer of printing in Indian languages, was only able to print in Devanagari. He later tried printing in Modi but by that time, Balbodh Devanagari had been accepted for printing.

=== Devanagari script ===
Marathi is usually written in the Balbodh variant of Devanagari script, an abugida consisting of 36 consonant letters and 16 initial-vowel letters. It is written from left to right. The Devanagari alphabet used to write Marathi is slightly different from the Devanagari alphabets of Hindi and other languages: there are additional letters in the Marathi alphabet and Western punctuation is used.

William Carey in 1807 Observed that as with other parts of India, a traditional duality existed in script usage between Devanagari for religious texts, and Modi for commerce and administration.

Although in the Mahratta country the Devanagari character is well known to men of education, yet a character is current among the men of business which is much smaller, and varies considerably in form from the Nagari, though the number and power of the letters nearly correspond.

==== Vowels ====
Devanagari	Transliterated	IPA	Pronunciation
अ	a	/ə/	
आ	ā	/a(ː)/	
इ	i	/i/	
ई	ī	/i(ː)/	
उ	u	/u/	
ऊ	ū	/u(ː)/	
ऋ	ṛ	/ru/	
ए	e	/e/	
ऐ	ai	/əi/	
ओ	o	/o/	
औ	au	/əu/	
अं	aṃ	/əm/	
अः	aḥ	/əɦə/	

==== Consonants ====
क	ख	ग	घ	ङ
ka /kə/	kha /kʰə/	ga /ɡə/	gha /ɡʱə/	ṅa (/ŋə/)
च	छ	ज	झ	ञ
ca, ċa /t͡ɕə/ or /t͡sə/	cha /t͡ɕʰə/	ja, j̈a /d͡ʑə/ or /d͡zə/	jha, j̈ha /d͡ʑʱə/ or /d͡zʱə/	ña (/ɲə/)
ट	ठ	ड	ढ	ण
ṭa /ʈə/	ṭha /ʈʰə/	ḍa /ɖə/	ḍha /ɖʱə/	ṇa /ɳə/
त	थ	द	ध	न
ta /tə/	tha /tʰə/	da /də/	dha /dʱə/	na /nə/
प	फ	ब	भ	म
pa /pə/	pha /pʰə/ or /fə/	ba /bə/	bha /bʱə/	ma /mə/
य	र	ल	व	
ya /jə/	ra /rə/	la /lə/	va /ʋə/	
श	ष	स	ह	
śa /ɕə/	ṣa /ʂə/	sa /sə/	ha /ɦə/	
ळ	क्ष	ज्ञ		
ḷa /𝼈ə/	kṣa /kʂə/	jña /dɲə/		

It is written from left to right. Devanagari used to write Marathi is slightly different from that of Hindi or other languages. It uses additional vowels and consonants that are not found in other languages that also use Devanagari.

==== Example of consonant–vowel combination ====
Combination of the vowels with K:

Script	Pronunciation (IPA)
क	/kə/
का	/kaː/
कि	/ki/
की	/kiː/
कु	/ku/
कू	/kuː/
कृ	/kru/
के	/ke/
कै	/kəi̯/
को	/ko/
कौ	/kəu̯/
कं	/kəm/
कः	/kəɦ(ə)/

=== Consonant clusters in Devanagari ===
In Devanagari, consonant letters by default come with an inherent schwa. Therefore, तयाचे will be 'təyāche', not 'tyāche'. To form 'tyāche', you will have to write it as त् + याचे, giving त्याचे.

When two or more consecutive consonants are followed by a vowel then a jodakshar (consonant cluster) is formed. Some examples of consonant clusters are shown below:

- त्याचे – tyāche – "his"
- प्रस्ताव – prastāva – "proposal"
- विद्या – vidyā – "knowledge"
- म्यान – myān – "Sheath/scabbard"
- त्वरा – tvarā – "immediate/Quick"
- महत्त्व – mahattva – "importance"
- फक्त – phakta – "only"
- बाहुल्या – bāhulyā – "dolls"
- कण्हेरी – kaṇherī – "oleander" (known for its flowers)
- न्हाणे – nhāṇe – "bathing"
- म्हणून – mhaṇūna – "therefore"
- तऱ्हा – taṟhā – "different way of behaving"
- कोल्हा – kolhā – "fox"
- केव्हा – kevhā – "when"

In writing, Marathi has a few digraphs that are rarely seen in the world's languages, including those denoting the so-called "nasal aspirates" (ṇh (ण्ह), nh (न्ह) and mh (म्ह)) and liquid aspirates (rh, ṟh, lh (ल्ह), and vh व्ह). Some examples are given above.

=== Eyelash reph/raphar ===
The eyelash reph/raphar (रेफ/ रफार) (र्‍) exists in Marathi as well as Nepali. The eyelash reph/raphar (र्‍) is produced in Unicode by the sequence [ra र ] + [virāma ्] + [ZWJ] and [rra ऱ ]+ [virāma ्] + [ZWJ]. In Marathi, when 'र' is the first consonant of a consonant cluster and occurs at the beginning of a syllable, it is written as an eyelash reph/raphar.

Examples
तर्‍हा
वाऱ्याचा
ऱ्हास
ऱ्हस्व
सुऱ्या
दोऱ्या

==== Minimal pairs ====
Using the (Simple) Reph/Raphar	Using the Eyelash Reph/Raphar
आचार्यास (to the teacher)	आचार्‍यास (to the cook)
दर्या (ocean)	दर्‍या (valleys)

=== The Modi script ===
From the thirteenth century until 1950, Marathi, especially in administration and business, was also written in the Modi script, a cursive script designed for minimising the lifting of pen from paper while writing.

=== Braille ===
In February 2008, Swagat Thorat published India's first Braille newspaper, the Marathi Sparshdnyan, a news, politics and current affairs fort nightly magazine.

== Grammar ==
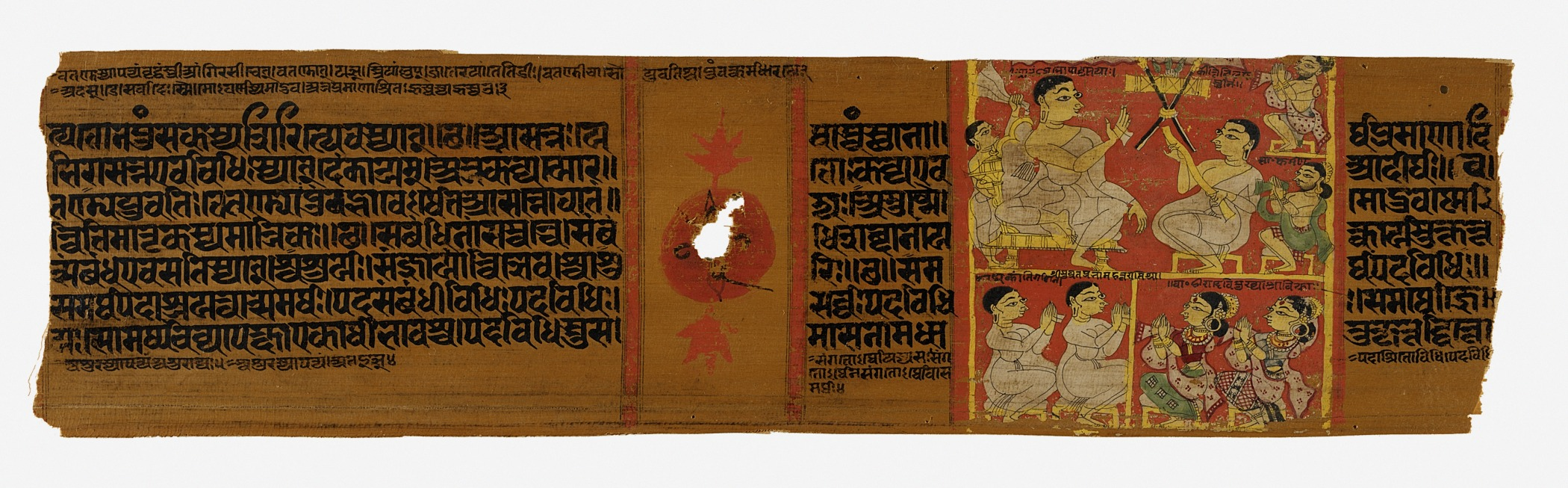
Acharya Hemacandra's grammar text Siddhahemashabdanushasana

Marathi grammar shares similarities with other modern Indo-Aryan languages. Jain Acharya Hemachandra is the grammarian of Maharashtri Prakrit. The first modern book exclusively concerning Marathi grammar was printed in 1805 by William Carey.

Marathi employs agglutinative, inflectional and analytical forms. Unlike most other Indo-Aryan languages, Marathi has kept three grammatical genders: masculine, feminine and neuter. The primary word order of Marathi is subject–object–verb Marathi follows a split-ergative pattern of verb agreement and case marking: it is ergative in constructions with either perfective transitive verbs or with the obligative ("should", "have to") and it is nominative elsewhere. An unusual feature of Marathi, as compared to other Indo-European languages, is that it displays inclusive and exclusive we, common to the Austroasiatic and Dravidian languages. Other similarities to Dravidian include the extensive use of participial constructions and also to a certain extent the use of the two anaphoric pronouns swətah and apəṇ. Numerous scholars have noted the existence of Dravidian linguistic patterns in the Marathi language.

== Sharing of linguistic resources with other languages ==
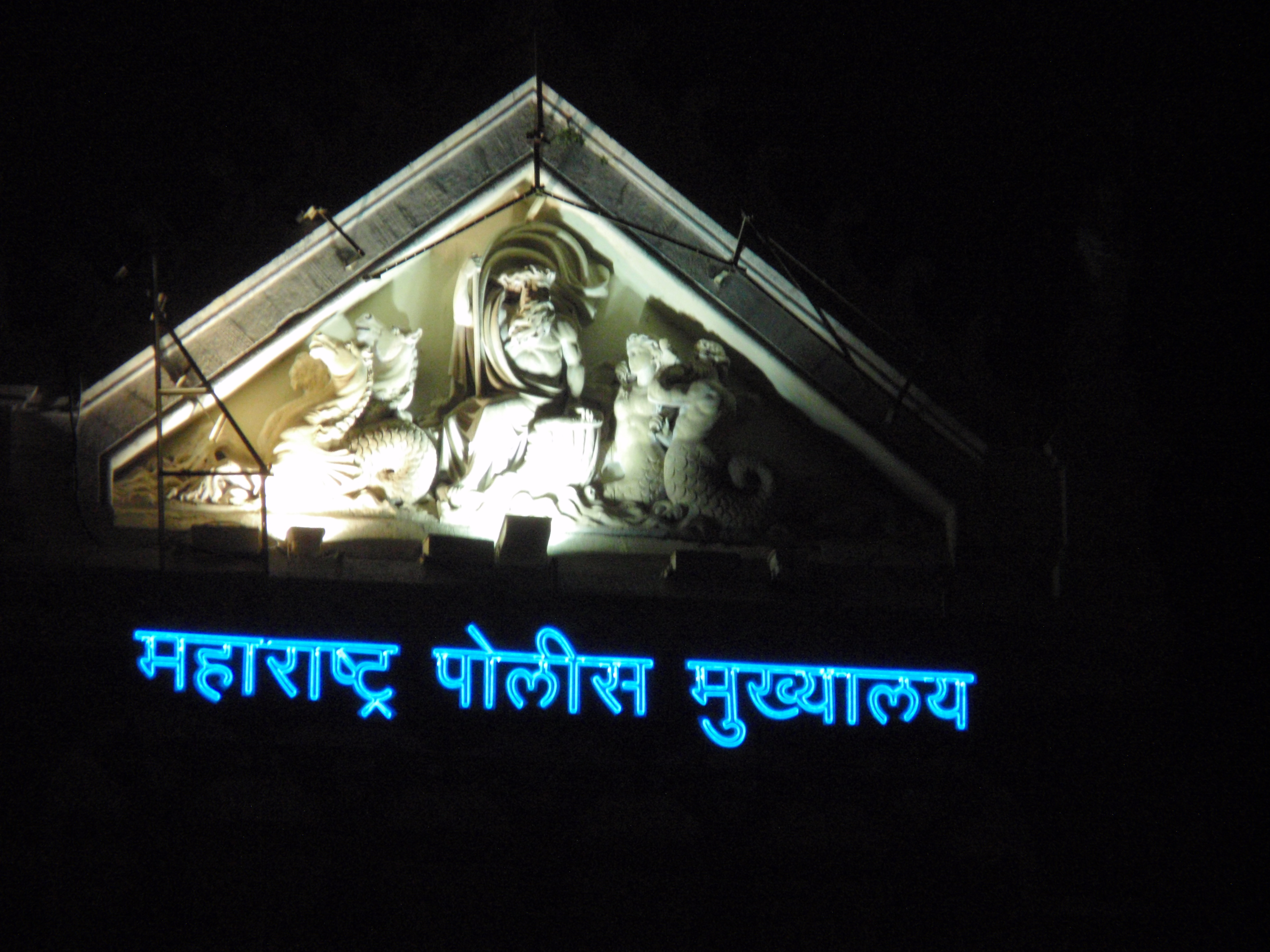
Marathi neon signboard at Maharashtra Police headquarters in Mumbai

Marathi is primarily influenced by Prakrit, Maharashtri, and Apabhraṃśa. Formal Marathi draws literary and technical vocabulary from Sanskrit. Marathi has also shared directions, vocabulary, and grammar with languages such as Indian Dravidian languages. Over a period of many centuries, the Marathi language and people have also come into contact with foreign languages such as Persian, Arabic, English, and European romance languages such as French, Spanish, Portuguese and other European languages.

=== Dravidian Influence ===
Spoken in the historically active region of the Deccan Plateau, the language has been subject to contact and mostly one-way influence with the surrounding Dravidian languages. Up to 5% of Marathi's basic vocabulary is of a Dravidian origin. According to various scholars like Bloch (1970) and Southworth (1971), Marathi's very origins can be traced to a pidgin or a substratum origin with surrounding Dravidian language.

=== Morphology and etymology ===
Spoken Marathi contains a number of words inherited from Sanskrit (tatsama). Such words are for example nantar (from nantara or after), pūrṇa (pūrṇa or complete, full, or full measure of something), ola (ola or damp), kāraṇ (kāraṇa or cause), puṣkaḷ (puṣkala or much, many), satat (satata or always), vichitra (vichitra or strange), svatah (svatah or himself/herself), prayatna (prayatna or effort, attempt), bhītī (from bhīti, or fear) and bhāṇḍe (bhāṇḍa or vessel for cooking or storing food). Other words ("tadbhavas") have undergone phonological changes from their Sanskrit roots, for example dār (dwāra or door), ghar (gṛha or house), vāgh (vyāghra or tiger), paḷaṇe (palāyate or to run away), kiti (kati or how many) have undergone more modification. Examples of words borrowed from other Indian and foreign languages include:

- Hawā: "air" directly borrowed from Arabic hawa
- Jamin: "land" borrowed from Persian zamin
- Kaydā: "law" borrowed from Arabic qaeda
- "Mahiti" : "information" borrowed from Arabic "Mahiyya"
- Jāhirāt: "advertisement" is derived from Arabic zaahiraat
- Marjī: "wish" is derived from Persian marzi
- Shiphāras: "recommendation" is derived from Persian sefaresh
- Hajērī: "attendance" from Urdu haziri
- Aṇṇā: "father", "grandfather" or "elder brother" borrowed from Dravidian languages
- Undira: "rat" borrowed from Munda languages

A lot of English words are commonly used in conversation and are considered to be assimilated into the Marathi vocabulary. These include words like "pen" (पेन्, pen) and "shirt" (शर्ट, sharṭa) whose native Marathi counterparts are lekhaṇī (लेखणी) and sadarā (सदरा) respectively.

=== Compounds ===
Marathi uses many morphological processes to join words together, forming compounds. For example, ati + uttam gives the word atyuttam, Ganesh + Utsav = Ganeshotsav, miith-bhaakar ("salt-bread"), udyog-patii ("businessman"), ashṭa-bhujaa ("eight-hands", name of a Hindu goddess).

=== Counting ===
Like many other languages, Marathi uses distinct names for the numbers 1 to 20 and each multiple of 10, and composite ones for those greater than 20.

As with other Indic languages, there are distinct names for the fractions 1/4, 1/2, and 3/4. They are pāva, ardhā, and pāuṇa, respectively. For most fractions greater than 1, the prefixes savvā-, sāḍē-, pāvaṇe- are used. There are special names for 3/2 (dīḍ), 5/2 (aḍīch), and 7/2 (aut).

Powers of ten are denoted by separate specific words as depicted in the table below.

Number power to 10	Marathi Number name	In Devanagari
10^{0}	Eka, Ekaka	एक/एकक
10^{1}	Daha, Dashaka	दहा/दशक
10^{2}	Shambhara, Shataka	शम्भर/शतक
10^{3}	Sahasra,	सहस्र
10^{4}	Dasha Sahasra	दशहजार/दशसहस्र
10^{5}	Lakha, Laksha	लाख/लक्ष
10^{6}	Daha Lakha, Dasha Laksha	दहा लाख (दशलक्ष)
10^{7}	Koti	कोटि
10^{8}	Dasha Koti	दशकोटि
10^{9}	Abja, Arbuda	अब्ज/अर्बुद
10^{10}	Dasha-Abja	दशाब्ज
10^{11}	Vrunda	वृन्द
10^{12}	Kharva (Kharab)	खर्व
10^{13}	Nikharva	निखर्व
10^{14}	Sashastra	सशस्त्र
10^{15}	Mahapadma, Padma	महापद्म/पद्म
10^{16}	Kamala	कमळ
10^{17}	Shanku, Shankha	शंकू/शंक
10^{17}	Skanda	स्कन्द
10^{18}	Suvachya	सुवाच्य
10^{19}	Jaladhi, Samudra	जलधी/समुद्र
10^{20}	Krutya	कृत्य
10^{21}	Antya	अन्त्य
10^{22}	Ajanma	आजन्म
10^{23}	Madhya	मध्य
10^{24}	Lakshmi	लक्ष्मी
10^{25}	Parardha	परार्ध

A positive integer is read by breaking it up from the tens digit leftwards, into parts each containing two digits, the only exception being the hundreds place containing only one digit instead of two. For example, 1,234,567 is written as 12,34,567 and read as 12 lakh 34 sahasra 5 she 67 (१२ लाख ३४ सहस्र ५ शे ६७).

Every two-digit number after 18 (11 to 18 are predefined) is read backward. For example, 21 is read एक-वीस (1-twenty). Also, a two digit number that ends with a 9 is considered to be the next tens place minus one. For example, 29 is एकोणतीस (एक-उणे-तीस) (thirty minus one). Two digit numbers used before Hazara are written in the same way.

== Marathi on computers and the Internet ==
Earlier Marathi suffered from weak support by computer operating systems and Internet services, as have other Indian languages. But recently, with the introduction of language localisation projects and new technologies, various software and Internet applications have been introduced. Marathi typing software is widely used and display interface packages are now available on Windows, Linux and macOS. Many Marathi websites, including Marathi newspapers, have become popular especially with Maharashtrians outside India. Online projects such as the Marathi language Wikipedia, with 102,000+ articles, the Marathi blogroll, and Marathi blogs have gained immense popularity.

== Natural language processing for Marathi ==
More recent attention has focused on developing natural language processing tools for Marathi. Some studies proposed a couple of text corpora for Marathi. L3CubeMahaSent is the first major publicly available Marathi dataset for sentiment analysis. It contains about 16,000 distinct tweets classified into three broad classes, such as positive, negative, and neutral. L3Cube-MahaNER is a dataset for named-entity recognition consisting of 25,000 manually tagged sentences categorised according to the eight entity classes. There are at least two public available datasets for hate speech detection in Marathi: L3Cube-MahaHate and HASOC2021.

The HASOC2021 dataset was proposed for conducting a machine learning competition on hate, offensive, and profane content identification in Marathi collocated with Forum for Information Retrieval Evaluation (FIRE 2021). The participants of the competition presented 25 solutions based on supervised learning. The winning teams used pre-trained language models (XLM-RoBERTa, Language Agnostic BERT Sentence Embeddings (LaBSE)) fine-tuned on the HASOC2021 dataset proposed by the organisers. The participants also experimented with the joint use of multilingual data for fine-tuning.

== Corpus development ==
Corpus linguistics shows how texts, sentences, or words from written or spoken language have changed over time or how they have been used in an organised way. The Volume VII: 'Indo-Aryan Languages (Southern Group) of the 'Linguistic Survey of India' by George Abraham Grierson describes first systematic and structured attempt to create documentation of Marathi language data.

Corpora of Marathi

Attempts have been made to create a corpus of Marathi. One of the first efforts to make a corpus with Indian text was the Kolhapur Corpus of Indian English (Shastri, 1986). The corpus was developed at the university in Maharastra, but Indian English was studied. The IIT Bombay WordNet (IndoWordNet; Bhattacharya, 2010) project in Indian languages includes Marathi. WordNet do not give word counts for further useful data analysis. The raw text based corpus in Marathi (Ramamoorthy et al., 2019a) is based on sampled pages from different select books. This work is carried out at Central Institute of Indian Languages, Mysore. A corpus-based linguistic study at the University of Mumbai explores the language contact between English and Marathi by compiling and analysing an overarching corpus of English loan-words in Marathi existing between the years 2001 and 2020. The study also investigates the attitudes of Marathi speakers towards English loan-words in contemporary Marathi, attempting to understand their motivations for borrowing English words (Doibale, 2022).

The work at University of Mumbai by Belhekar and Bhargava (2023) provided the first Marathi word count collection (Marathi WordCorp). The bag-of-words (BoW) model was used to make 1-gram (single-word) Marathi WordCorp. They used more than 700 complete works of literature.

The Google Books Ngram Viewer (Michel et al., 2011) is a relatively new and advanced method that shows how the frequency of n-grams has changed over a specific period. There is no database of Indian languages in the Google Books Ngram viewer. The Indian Languages Word Corpus (ILWC) WebApp, which was made by Belhekar and Bhargava, shows how often words are used by decade from before 1920 to 2020. The limitation with the method is that it only gives researchers the raw OCR data to "combine and collapse frequencies of correctly and incorrectly recognised words" (p. 2).

Statistical models for Marathi corpora

Attempts to evaluate statistical models for Marathi language Corpuses and text-collections have been carried out. For the Marathi corpus (Marathi WordCorp), the y-intercept of Zipf's law is reported as 12.49, and the coefficient is 0.89 and these numbers show that Zipf's law is applicable for Marathi language. The coefficients show that the number of words and texts used in the corpus metadata is enough. Heaps' law intercept for the Marathi word corpora is 2.48, and the coefficient is 0.73. The coefficient values show that there are more unique words in Marathi writings than would be expected. The higher number of unique words could be due to the number of alphabets (36 consonant letters and 16 initial-vowel letters, with each consonant taking 14 forms with vowel pairs), the orthographic features of the Devanagari script (for example, the same word can be written in different ways), the use of consonant clusters (jodakshar), the number of suffixes a word can have, etc.

== Marathi Language Day ==
Marathi Language Day (मराठी दिन/मराठी दिवस transl. Marathi Dina/Marathi Diwasa) is celebrated on 27 February every year across the Indian states of Maharashtra. This day is regulated by the Ministry of Marathi Language. It is celebrated on the Birthday of eminent Marathi Poet V.V. Shirwadkar, popularly known as Kusumagraj. Essay competitions and seminars are arranged in schools and colleges, and government officials are asked to conduct various events.

== Marathi language policies in Maharashtra ==
In 2022, the Bombay High Court rejected a petition by the Federation of Retail Traders challenging the Maharashtra government's requirement that shops and establishments display signboards in Marathi written in Devanagari script. The matter later reached the Supreme Court, which urged Mumbai traders to comply with the law requiring Marathi signboards outside shops in Maharashtra. Enforcement has continued in Mumbai; in May 2026, The Brihanmumbai Municipal Corporation had lodged cases against 1,423 establishments, collected ₹1.05 crore in penalties, and sent notices to 3,774 shops for non-compliance with Marathi signboard rules since November 2023.

=== Criticism ===
Critics of the policy allege that language-related laws, enforcement actions, and political campaigns in Maharashtra have placed pressure on non-Marathi-speaking residents and businesses. Critics have used the term "language imposition" in relation to measures such as compulsory Marathi signboards for shops and establishments, as well as public demands that residents and workers speak Marathi in daily interactions. Critics have argued that such requirements impose additional compliance burdens on traders and migrants, especially in multilingual urban areas such as Mumbai, Pune, and Thane.

=== Campaign by MNS ===
Critics of the Marathi policy have concerns about coercions linked to reported incidents involving activists of Maharashtra Navnirman Sena. In July 2025, a shopkeeper in Mira-Bhayandar was assaulted for not speaking Marathi; the accused were members of MNS. The Indian Express also reported multiple incidents in Mumbai in which Maharashtra Navnirman Sena workers allegedly attacked shopkeepers and migrant workers for speaking Hindi instead of Marathi. awyers wrote to the Maharashtra Director General of Police seeking action against the MNS over alleged attacks on non-Marathi speakers, claiming that such incidents threatened public order and national unity. MNS chief Raj Thackeray warned non-Marathi speakers in Mumbai that they could be slapped if they "fool around", remarks that drew criticism amid reports of language-related assaults. These developments have contributed to debate over linguistic rights, regional identity, migration, and the discriminatory treatment of non-Marathi speakers in Maharashtra, given that only 35% of Mumbai's population speak Marathi, declining from 39% in 2001.

== See also ==
- Konkani language
