= Keshav Rao Koratkar =

Indian activist

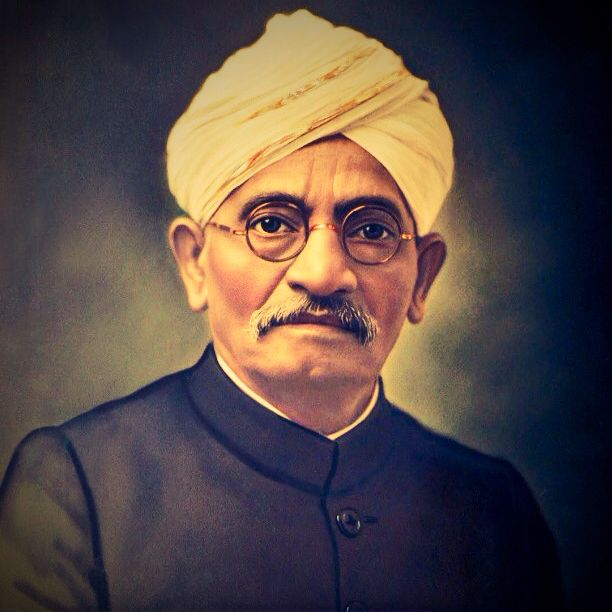
- Born: 1867
- Died: 21 May 1932 (aged 65)
- Known for: Social reform

Keshav Rao Koratkar (1867–1932), was a pioneer of political, social, and educational reforms in Hyderabad State, India. Initially working on behalf of the Marathi people, he became involved in the Indian independence movement.

== Early years and career ==
Keshav Rao Koratkar was born in a Deshastha Brahmin family in 1867 at Purjal Village in his maternal grandfather's house. He was one among the five sons of Santukarao, a Maharashtrian. At the age of nine, Keshavraoji left for his sister's house in Gulbarga where he started learning Urdu. He decided to pursue law as a career; in 1889 he passed both law and judiciary exams and started his law career at Hyderabad in 1896. A highlight of his law career was his appointments as the High Court Judge for the state of Hyderabad.

== Community service ==
For over two decades Keshavrao was closely associated with the reform movement of Arya Samaj in Hyderabad. He was the President of Hyderabad Samajik Sudhar Sangh, a social reform organization. In 1907, he was instrumental in starting a school with Marathi as the language of instruction for the large local Marathi speaking community at Residency Bazar. The school was named as Vivek Vardhani and was formally established on 25 October 1907. Keshaorao was elected as the first President of the school. He was also actively involved in starting a school in 1907 in Gulbarga with his friend Sri Vittalrao Davulgavkar. The school was named as Nutan Vidyalay. He started a Marathi library in 1920 in Hyderabad and inspired the Mararastrian youth. He was instrumental in starting a Marathi monthly magazine named Rajhansa. He was actively involved in starting “Social Service League” to combat influenza in Hyderabad in 1918. Hyderabad government honored him for his selfless work during this period. He actively supported “Nijam Vijay”, marathi newspaper started by Shri Lakshmanrao Phatak in 1920. He was elected as the first President of “Vidarbha Sahitya Sangha” started by Balwant Ganesh Khaparde in 1923.

== Indian Independence Movement ==
Keshavrao was influenced by his friend Bal Gangadhar Tilak, and on his request in 1897 he helped the Chapekar brothers of Pune, who were in hiding, seek medical help in Hyderabad. He became a part of the Khilafat movement. Although mainly a Muslim religious movement, it became a part of the wider Indian independence movement. In 1919 Keshavrao missed his daughter's wedding to lead the Khilafat Movement rally, an incident which exemplified his commitment to cause over family.

== Final years ==
Keshavrao's final years were marked by ill health due to undiagnosed diabetes and impaired vision. On 20 May 1930, he went into diabetic coma, and died on 21 May 1930.

His son Shri Vidyalankar V. K. Koratkar is also Member of Hyderabad and Bombay Legislature and Lok Sabha.
