= Indo-Iranian =

Indo-Iranian may refer to:

- Indo-Iranian languages
- Indo-Iranians, the various peoples speaking these languages
- India–Iran relations
- Indo-Iranian Journal

== See also ==
- Aryan
- Proto-Indo-Iranian language
- Indo-Iranian languages
- Indo-European languages
- Indo-Aryan peoples
- Irano-Afghan race
- Iranian peoples
