= Powada =

Genre of Marathi poetry

The powada (Marathi: पोवाडा) is a genre of Marathi poetry that was during the late 17th century in India. Powada, which means ‘to glorify’, is a traditional Marathi ballad that traces its history to more than 750 years Powadas often glorified and celebrated deeds of popular folk figures and leaders such as Chhatrapati Shivaji and Tanaji Malusare, and were also written to raise awareness on social issues such as female foeticide, dowry and corruption. Powadas were also used as a medium to create awareness during Samyukta Maharashtra movement.

Powada is also a genre of poetry popular in Uttarakhand, specifically that glorifies warriors. It is popular in Kumaun and Garhwal regions of the state and is sung, performed, or narrated on various occasions. It is also known as "Bhada"

== Details ==
=== Powada during Maratha Empire ===
The composer-cum-singers of the powadas are known as Shahirs. The professional Powada singers formed a guild or caste called the Gondhalis. The earliest notable powada was The Killing of Afzal Khan (अफझल खानाचा वध) by Agnidas, which recorded Shivaji's encounter with Afzal Khan. The next notable powada was Tanaji Malusare (तानाजी मालुसरे ) by Tulsidas, which gave an account of the capture of Sinhagad Fort by Tanaji. Another notable contemporary powada was Baji Pasalkar (बाजी पासलकर ) by Yamaji Bhaskar. They are also mentioned in the 13th century Marathi scripture Dnyaneshwari.

During the Maratha Confederacy rule, several celebrated Shahir poet-singers, which include Ram Joshi (1762–1812), Anant Phandi (1744–1819), Honaji Bala (1754–1844) and Prabhakar (1769–1843) also composed powadas.

=== Powada during Independent India ===
During the 20th Century, Shahir Annabhau Sathe, Atmaram Patil and Shahir Amar Sheikh wrote powadas to inspire /support the mass movement for formation of unified Maharashtra State.

Shahir Bashir Momin Kavathekar is known for his popular Powada's that celebrate heroics of Chatrapati Shivaji Maharaj, Prataprao Gujar as well those celebrating the accomplishments of leaders in the Indian independence movement like Azad Hind Sena's Subhash Chandra Bose, Dr. Babasaheb Ambedkar, trailblazers in education/ social movements like Karmveer Dr. Bhaurao Patil. One of the Powada written by Lokshahir Bashir Momin Kavathekar is reproduced below for example:

भिमरायाने मोलाचा संदेश दिला I आम्ही ही स्वीकारली पंचशीला ll
त्या भिमाच्या रूपाने एक सूर्य उगविला l जीवनातला अंधार पार निघूनच गेला llध्रुll
दलितांना नव्हते पाणी, दलितांना नव्हती वाणी l माणूस एक असोनी जवळी ना घेती कोणी ll
परी ह्या भीमाने एक चमत्कारच केला ll१ll....

== In popular culture ==
- In the marathi play "Vedat Marathi Veer Daudale Saat" (1977), a Powada remembering Prataprao Gujar was played.
- In the Marathi movie, Me Shivajiraje Bhosale Boltoy (2009), the powada, Afzal Khanacha Vadh is played.
- Tanhaji, a 2020 Hindi movie, was made based on the Tanaji Malusare powada.

About sixty powadas were collected by Harry Arbuthnot Acworth and S. T. Shaligram and published under the title, The Saga of Historical Heroic Men and Women (इतिहास प्रसिद्ध महापुरुषांचे व स्त्रियांचे पोवाडे ) in 1891. Out of these, ten powadas were translated into English verse by H. A. Acworth and published as Ballads of the Marathas in 1894.

== See also ==
- Marathi literature
- Indian literature
