= Vaman Pandit =

Marathi Scholar and Poet of India (1608-1695)

Vaman Tanaji Sesha
- Born: 1608
- Died: 1695 (aged 86–87)

Vaman Pandit (born Vaman Tanaji Sesha; 1608–1695) was a Marathi scholar and poet of India. Vaman Pandit from the house of Sesha was a great poet whose poetry made quite an impact on the whole Maharashtra. Vaman Pandit's narrative poem have been very popular with masses and the Kirtankars. His main contribution lies in the fact that he has given a sound metaphysical foundation to the concept of Bhakti.

== Early life ==
Vaman Pandit was born into Deshastha Rigvedi Brahmin (DRB) family of Madhva Sampradaya in Dharwad, Karnataka in a prominent Sesha family of poets and scholars. The family who hailed from Nanded had moved to Dharwad but still maintain roots in Nanded. Vaman Pandit was a follower of Madhvacharya a prominent Vaishnava philosopher. He migrated to Kashi for a significant period of his life. Vaman Pandit regards the Saguna brahman ( Personal God) as superior to the Nirguna Brahman (Impersonal God). He considers Lord Krishna as Saguna Brahman incarnate.

== Literary works ==
His most significant work, the Yatharthadipika is a commentary on the Bhagavadgita. His book Nigamasara (1673) describes in detail the Vargavi Varuni Vidya (Vedanta). His other work includes Samashloki Gita, Karmatatva, Bhaminivilasa, Radhavilasa, Rasakrida, Ahalyoddhara, Vanasudha, Venusudha, Gajendramoksha and Sita Svayamvara. The captivating style and religious instruction of his work have made them popular with all sections of readers. In 1695 after death, a Samadhi site is built on the banks of Warana River in Koregaon village of Sangali district. He has employed metres, figures of speech and other techniques of Sanskrit poetry in his works.

He was noted for his mastery of 'shlok' form: 'सुश्लोक वामनाचा'. And also for his mastery over long rhymes: 'यमक्या वामन'.

== Bibliography ==
- Lal, Mohan (1992). Encyclopaedia of Indian Literature: Sasay to Zorgot. Sahitya Akademi. ISBN 9788126012213.
- Sharma, B. N. Krishnamurti (2000). A History of the Dvaita School of Vedānta and Its Literature, Vol 1. 3rd Edition. Motilal Banarsidass (2008 Reprint). ISBN 978-8120815759.
- Kusumawati Deshpande and M.V.Rajadhyaksha, A history of Marathi literature (New Delhi: Sahitya Akademi, 1988), pp31–33
- S.G.Kanhere, ‘Waman Pandit - scholar and Marathi poet’ Bulletin of the School of Oriental and African Studies, University of London v4, 1926, pp305–314
