= Krishnamurthypuram =

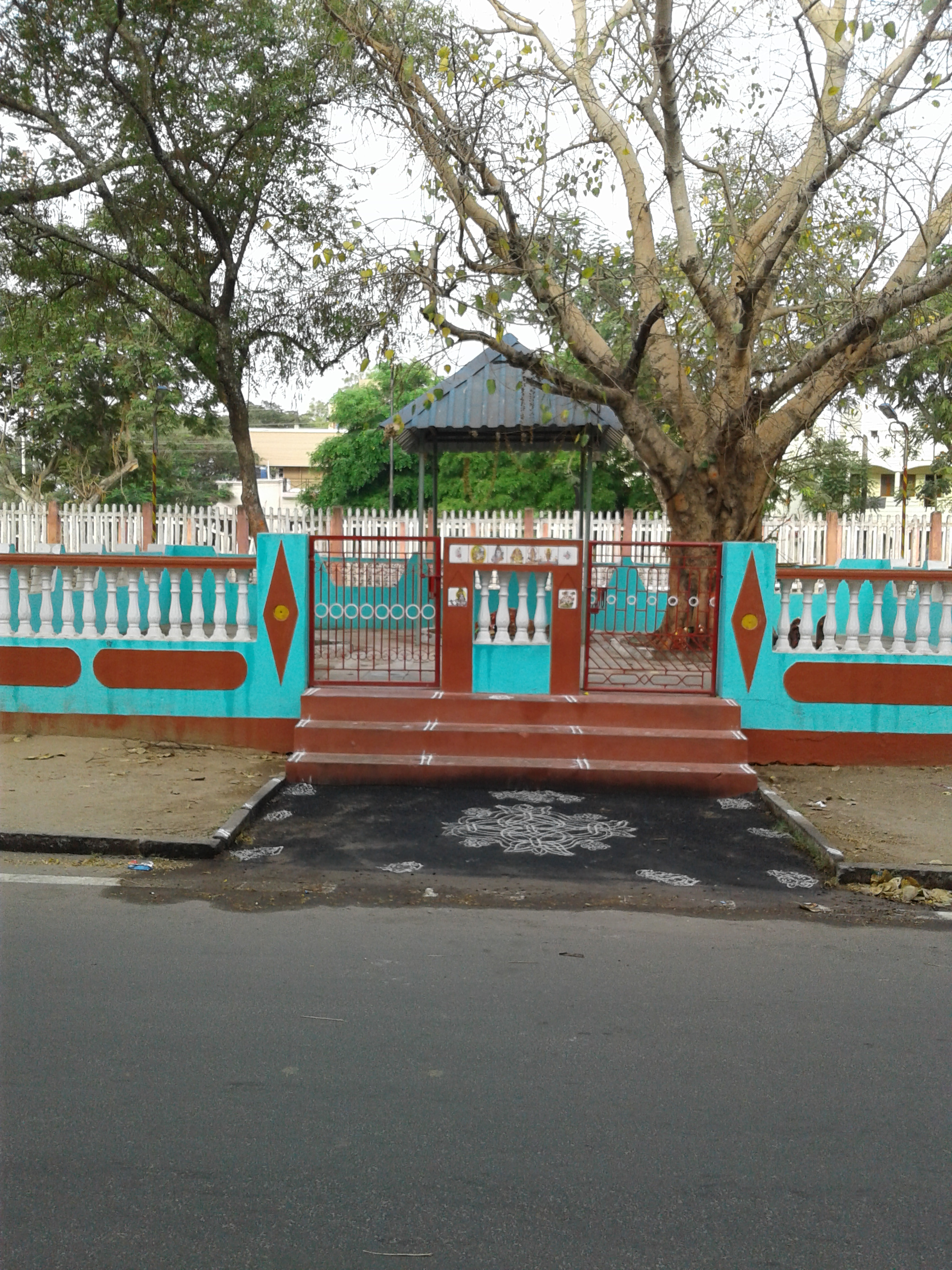
Temple at Jayanagar Railway Gate

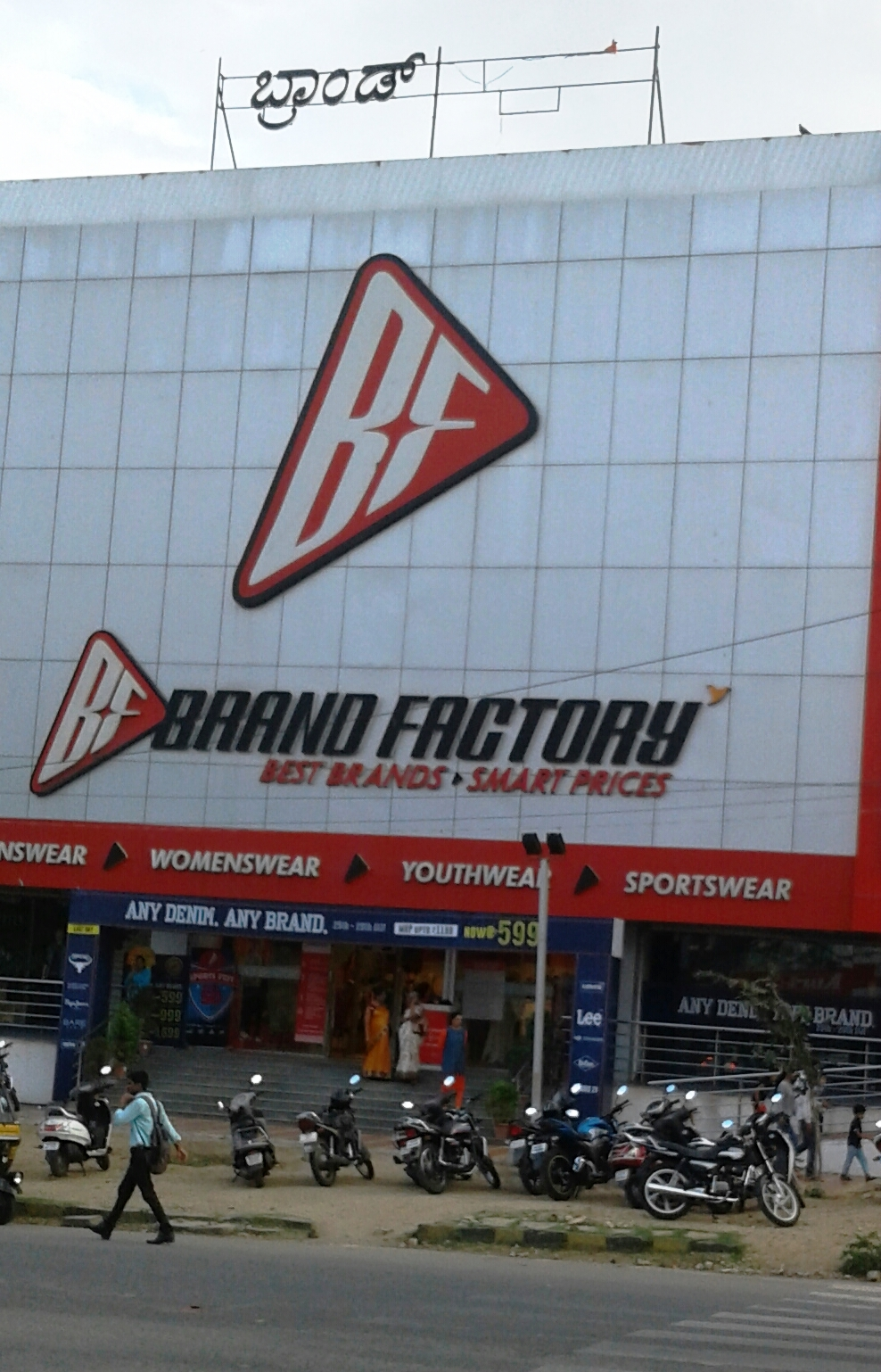
Underbridge Junction

Krishna Murthy Puram is an urban commercial and residential suburb of Mysore city in Karnataka state, India.

== Etymology ==
It was named after P. N. Krishnamurti, Diwan of Mysore Kingdom and grandson of Purnaiah, another Diwan. Krishnamurti is the only Dewan who has an extension named in his honour in Mysuru city.

== Location ==
Krishnamurthypuram is located on the southern side of Mysore city between Lakshmipuram, Ashokapuram, Chamarajapuram and K. G. Koppal.

== Mythri Institute ==
Mythri Institute runs a hostel for mentally challenged children. It was established in 1982. It was the first school of this type in Mysore.

== Educational organisations ==
- Vanithasadhana School
- Sarada Vilas educational institutions
- Bhagini seva samaja
- Aramane Padmaraja School
- Gokula School
- Gopalaswamy School
- C.T.I.College

== Post office ==
Krishnamurthypuram is known as Mysore-4. There is a post office at Krishnamurthypuram and the pincode is 570004.

== Economy ==
Krishnamurthypuram is a former residential colony now partially converted to a downtown area of Mysore. There are many banks, shops and restaurants in this area.
