= Yelandur estate =

Yelandur Estate
- Jagir of Kingdom of Mysore and later British India
- 1807–1956
- Area
  - 1901: 264 km^{2} (102 sq mi)
- Population
  - 1901: 35,271
- History
  - Established: 1807
  - Abolition of the estate: 1956
Succeeded by
India

Estate of Yelandur or Yelandur Jagir was an princely estate in the erstwhile State of Mysore of Madras Presidency. At present it is located in the Chamarajanagara district in the Indian state of Karnataka..The town of Yelandur was the administrative headquarters.

== History ==
On 27 November 1807 Yelandur was given in jagir by the British East India company to Dewan Purnaiah in recognition of his services as Dewan of Mysore Kingdom at a special Durbar 1807. Shri Krishna Charya Purnaiya was the first Jagirdar of the estate. The jagir consisted of 46 villages.

The last holder of the estate, Raghavendra Rao Purnaiya, was awarded compensation by the State Government under the provisions of the Karnataka (Personal and Miscellaneous) Inams Abolition Act, 1954.

== Jagirdars/Rulers of Yelandur ==
The rulers of Yelandur estate were Deshastha Madhva Brahmins and were devout followers of Uttaradi Matha. The rulers of Yelandur estate were

- Purnaiah — (1807–1812)
- Anantharamappa — (1812–1825)
- Srinivasa Murthy — (1825–1830)
- Narasingha Rao Krishnamurthy — (1830–1858)
- Sir P. N. Krishnamurti — (1858–1911), also Dewan of Mysore (1901–1906)
- Narasingha Rao Purniah — (1911–1920)
- Nagaraja Rao Purnaiya — (1920–1960) — accession in 1956
- Raghavendra Rao Purnaiya — (1960–2001)
