= Marathi people (Uttar Pradesh) =

Marathi speaking people of Uttar Pradesh, India

The Marathi people are the Marathi-speaking migrants from present day Maharashtra, who migrated to Uttar Pradesh during medieval period. The Marathi people, especially the Marathi Brahmins migrated to the Hindu holy city of Varanasi and other parts of Uttar Pradesh during the Medieval Period of India and dominated the intellectual life of the city and established an important presence at the Mughal and other north Indian courts. Marathi Brahmins in particular Deshasthas excelled in the Pancha Dravida Vedic expert post. The Varanasi pandits were final authority to decide the ritual status of any caste during intercaste dispute. Varanasi pandits like Kamalakara bhatta became head of Pancha Dravida Kashi/Varanasi pandits and played an important role in solving intercaste dispute between Brahmins of Maharashtra. Anandadeo Bhatta and Gaga Bhatta played an important role in solving the intercaste dispute in Maharashtra related to ritual status, they were well known for solving ritual status issue during Shivaji Rajyabhishek. During Peshwa Raj due to monopoly of Chitpavans in Pune, many families of Deshastha Brahmins and Gaud Saraswat Brahmins migrated to the newly formed Malwa state(Uttar Pradesh and Madhya Pradesh) and occupied higher administrative posts. According to the Economic Times, The Marathi population in Uttar Pradesh is now mainly concentrated in Kanpur, Varanasi, Prayagraj, Jhansi and Lucknow.
