= Gadkari =

Gadkari is a surname native to the Indian state of Maharashtra. Gadkari surname is found among the Hindu CKP and Deshastha Brahmin communities.

== Etymology ==
The name Gadkari is believed to be a combination of two words (Gad and Kari). Gad means a fort and Kari means one who maintains or protects it. So Gadkari means a person who protects the fort.

== Gadkari as a title ==
Gadkari was a historical title given mostly in Maharashtra, to a person who was appointed to protect the fort.

== Notable people ==
- Ram Ganesh Gadkari (1885-1919), Marathi poet
- Chandrasekhar Gadkari (1928-1998), Indian test cricketer
- Madhav Yeshwant Gadkari (1928–2006), Indian Journalist, Padma Shri award recipient
- Nitin Gadkari (born 1957), India's Minister of Road Transport and Highways
- Sandesh Gadkari (born 1987), Indian cricketer
- Jui Gadkari (born 1988), Indian actress

== Other ==
- Gadkari – 2023 Marathi language film based on Nitin Gadkari
