= Lakshmipuram, Mysore =

Suburb of Mysore city in Karnataka state, India

Coordinates: 12.296730885593218°N 76.64468901515448°E

Lakshmipura is a suburb of Mysore city in Karnataka state, India.

== Location ==
Located between Devaraja Mohalla, Nanju Malige, Chamundipuram, Krishnamurthypuram is one of the settlements in Mysore City. Ballal Circle, Karnataka State Dr. Gangubhai Hangal Music and Performing Arts University are some prominent landmarks in the locality.
