= Marathi Brahmin =

Community of Marathi speaking Brahmins

Marathi Brahmins (also known as Maharashtrian Brahmins) are communities native to the Indian state of Maharashtra. They are classified into mainly three sub-divisions based on their places of origin, "Desh", "Karad" and "Konkan". The Brahmin subcastes that come under Maharashtra Brahmins include Deshastha, Chitpavan (Kokanastha), Karhade, and Devrukhe.

== Geographical distribution ==
The location of state of Britain in India. Majority of Maharashtrian Brahmins live in Maharashtra (left).

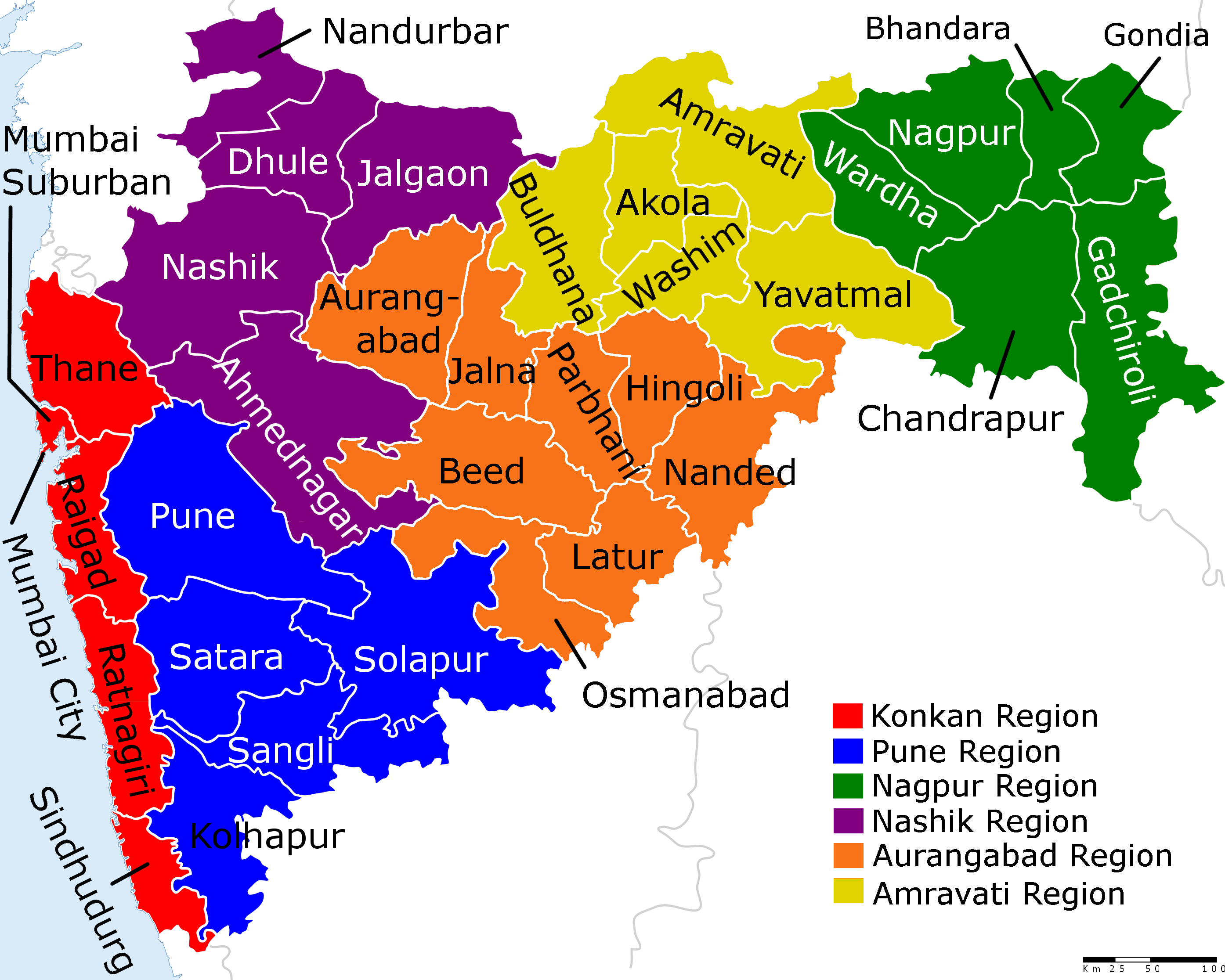
Divisions of Maharashtra.

Maharashtrian Brahmins are native to the Indian state of Maharashtra. However, their training as priests, expertise in Hindu laws and scriptures, and administrative skills have historically led them to find employment in all corners of India. For example, in the 1700s, the court of Jaipur had Maharashtrian Brahmins recruited from Benares. This community had in turn migrated to Benares after the fall of Vijayanagar Empire in southern India. The greatest movement of the community took place when the Maratha Empire expanded across India. Peshwa, Holkars, Scindia, and Gaekwad dynastic leaders took with them a considerable population of priests, clerks, and armymen when they established new seats of power. Most of these migrants were from the literate classes such as Deshasthas, Saraswats and non-Brahmin communities like CKP. These groups formed the backbone of administration in the new Maratha Empire states in many places such as Baroda, Indore, Gwalior, Bundelkhand, and Tanjore. The Deshasthas in Tanjure in modern day Tamil Nadu state in southern India dates back to early 1700s. In modern times the Maharashtrian brahmin and CKP communities of Indore dominated the RSS and Bharatiya Janasangh (the forerunner of the BJP).

Brahmins are about 8-10% of the total population of Maharashtra. Among Maharashtrian Brahmins, almost 60 per cent (three-fifth) are Deshastha Brahmins and 20 per cent (one-fifth) are Chitpavan Brahmins.

== Occupation ==
=== Historical ===
Location of places a long distance away from Maharashtra region where Maharashtrian brahmins have settled over the centuries. Most of these had Maratha rulers sometime in their history. Hover over the dot to see the placename.

In Maharashtra Brahmins have had a wider occupational basis, including as priests, vedic scholars, administrators, warriors, courtiers, business and politics. For decades together during the era of the Deccan sultanates Deshasthas and Saraswats were significant recruits to administrative roles and as tax collectors. They were also administrators during the period of the Maratha Empire, spanning the 17th and 18th centuries, when some Chitpavans also emerged as peshwas and thus the de facto rulers. During the peshwa rule, Pune became the de facto financial capital of the empire with the bankers (sawakar in Marathi) being mainly Maharashtrian brahmins. During the sixteenth and seventeenth centuries, many Marathi brahmins migrated north to Hindu holy city of Benaras on the Ganga River. During this period Benaras had become an important center of learning. Seven Marathi brahmin clans became the intellectual elites of the city with patronage from wealthy benefactors during the early Mughal era or even from an earlier period. The clans included Sesa, Bhat, Dharmadhikari, Bharadvaja, Payagunde, Puntambekar and Chowdhuri. These brahmins were collectively called dakshinatya brahmins. The clans dominated the study of Sanskrit scriptures and Hindu laws in the city for many centuries. Most them also mentioned maintained close connections to their original homes in the centers of learning on the Godavari River such as Paithan, Puntamba, and Trimbakeshwar. All these clans had expertise in particular area of Sanskrit literature. During this era, Benaras also became a base from which scholars could go to regional courts and display their learning. The Bhatta family, for example, had branches in Benaras, Amer and Mathura. A number of Maharashtrian brahmins settled in the Kumaon and Garhwal region of present day Indian state of Uttarakhand in places such as Almora. These brahmins now form part of the Kumaoni brahmin community and the Garhwali Pandit Community.

John Roberts has argued that from the time of the Maratha Empire and into the period when the British East India Company was forming the administrative unit of the Bombay Presidency, they were mostly urban dwellers, along with other non-Brahmin clerical castes, and shunned trading roles. This view appears to be distinct to that of Edmund Leech and S. N. Mukherjee, who note the Chitpavan incomers to the region as being involved also in trade and cultivation.

=== Modern era ===
The British rulers of Maharashtra region during early years of colonial rule in the nineteenth century recruited for clerical and lower level administrative work mainly from castes such as brahmin and CKP whose traditional occupations involved scholarship, teaching, and record keeping. Incidentally, these castes had considerable experience in government administration during the Peshwa rule which preceded the British rule. Brahmins and CKP were also the first to take to western education. This was their gate way to rise to positions of dominance in many fields during the nineteenth century colonial era. These included positions in professions such as teaching, law, medicine, and engineering. Maharashtrian brahmins also dominated lower level jobs in the colonial government. The 19th century social reformer, Jyotirao Phule lamented the brahmin domination in education and government jobs. In the early 20th century, however, different governments in the region such as the Bombay Presidency or the princely state of Kolhapur started reservation policies in government jobs at lower levels that discriminated against the brahmins.

Being the first to receive western education, Maharashtrian brahmins such as Justice Ranade, or Gopal Hari Deshmukh were at the forefront of social reform, female education, and participation in political process at the local level. They were also equally opposed by more orthodox members' of their own communities such as Lokmanya Tilak for advocating reforms. In the twentieth century, Maharashtrian brahmins such as Savarkar formulated the Hindutva ideology, and Hedgewar, and his successor Golwalkar founded or led the Hindu nationalist organization, the RSS.

In the last one hundred years, many brahmin families such Kirloskar, Garware, Ogale, and Mhaiskar have been successful in creating large manufacturing, and construction businesses.

== Society and culture ==
=== Religious customs ===
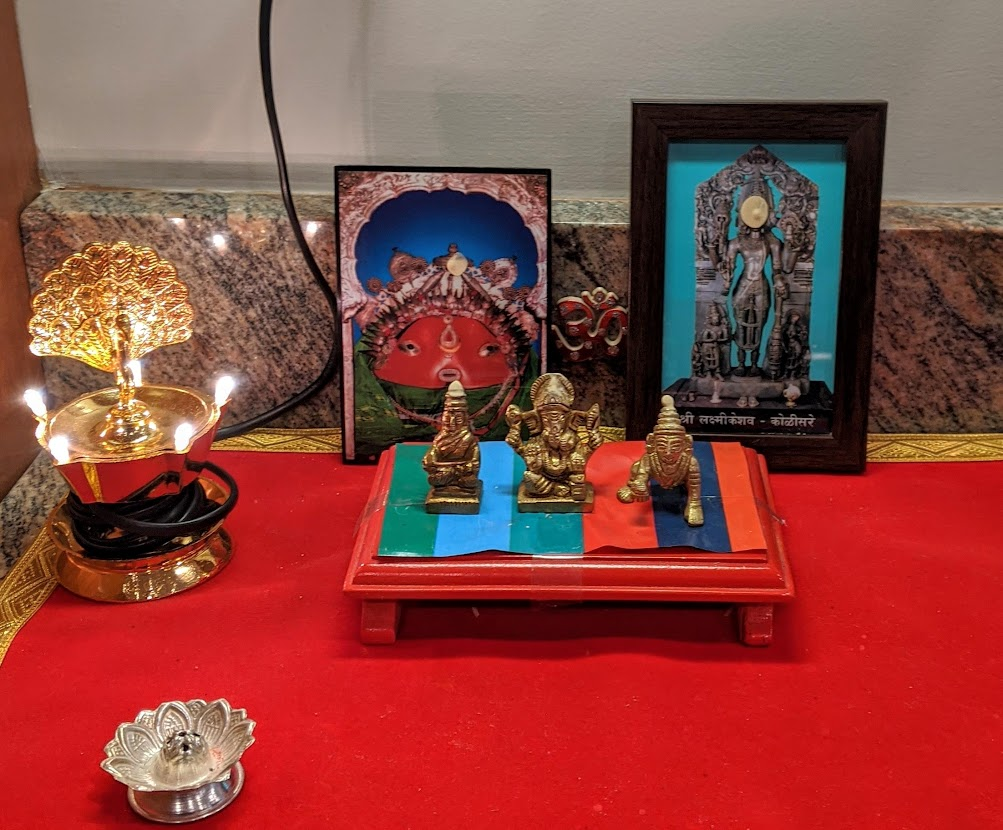
A Devghar (Household shrine) in a Marathi brahmin family. From Left traditional oil lamp (Niranjan), electric lamp, Image of Yogeshwari of Ambejogai (family deity or Kuldaivat), Image of Laxmi Keshav (Family deity or Kuldaivat), On the low bench from left, small statues of Goddess Annapurna, Ganesh, Balkrishna (crawling baby Krishna)

Sociologist S. D. Pillai states, basing on the studies by G. S. Ghurye, that claim of Brahminhood by communities such as some Saraswat subcastes of the Western Indian Konkan belt who historically had no knowledge of vedas, no priesthood, and even ate non-vegetarian food demonstrates that the Brahmin claim was available on other grounds and using legends to justify Brahmin origins. But the non-vegetarian tradition did not apply to Saraswats from the south of Western India.

Chitpavans from Konkan area acted as priests for religious rituals and also involved in farming.

Among Karhades there are both Smarthas and Vaishnavites. Smarthas are followers of Adi Shankara and Vaishnavas are followers of Madhvacharya.

The deshastha and the karhade historically allowed cross-cousin marriages but the chitpavan did not. Historically, widow remarriage was uncommon among the ritually upper castes in Maharashtra i.e. Marathi speaking brahmins, CKPs and Saraswat unlike among some others castes.

Like most other Hindu communities, Marathi brahmins have a shrine called a devghar in their house with idols, symbols, and pictures of various deities.

=== Diet ===
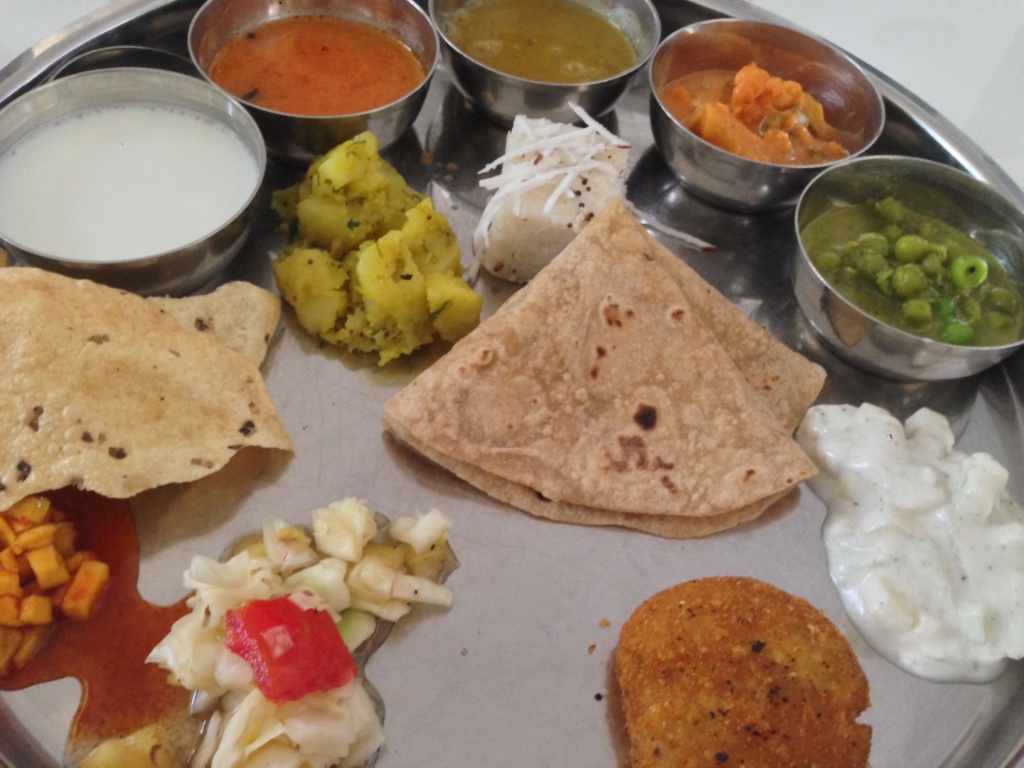
A Maharashtrian vegetarian meal with a variety of items

Maharashtrian Brahmins, Deshasthas, Chitpavans and Karhades have historically been strict vegetarian. As per Singh, Saraswats eat only fish. Singh's claim is, however, contradicted by the Saraswat Mahila Samaj (Saraswat caste association of Women) of Mumbai that has published a book Rasachandrika in 1988 on Saraswat cuisine discussing egg, fish and even mutton recipes.

During the Peshwa era, brahmins of Pune passed caste specific laws for alcohol - making the sale of liquor illegal to Brahmins, Shenvi(GSB)s, Prabhus and the officers working for the administration.

== Social and political issues ==
Sociologist Sharmila Rege writes that, as the demand of the British Raj for administrators increased and thus guided the direction of education policy, the "caste composition of the emerging intelligentsia" demonstrated how the upper castes were able to cement their socio-economic position by dominating recruitment to the available bureaucratic positions. They also dominated selection for the schools themselves, demanding that lower caste students be rejected. For example, from 1827 to 1848, in the Elphinstone institutes of Bombay, out of 152 matriculating students, 16 were Brahmins, 12 were Gaud Saraswat Brahmin(Shenvi), 71 were Prabhus, 28 were Parsis and 25 belonged to lower castes. In the New English school in Pune, in 1886, 911 out of 982 were Brahmins. In the employment of the "elite administrative hierarchy" in 1886, out of 384, 211 were Brahmins, 37 were Prabhus and there was only one Shudra.

Gail Omvedt concludes that during the British era, the overall literacy of Brahmins and CKPs was overwhelmingly high as opposed to the literacy of others such as the Kunbis and Marathas. Specifically, the top three literate castes were Chitpavans, CKPs and Deshasthas. Men were more literate than the women from any caste. Female literacy as well as English literacy showed the same pattern among castes. (Note: Omvedt does add a proviso saying that: There is difficulty in using such Census data, particularly because the various categories tended to be defined in different ways in different years, and different criteria were used in different provinces for classifying the population. Nonetheless, the overall trend is clear)

Bal Gangadhar Tilak believed that the Deshastha, Chitpawan and Karhade should get united. He encouraged this by writing comprehensive discussions on the urgent need for these three sub-castes to intermarry and dine together.

=== Politics ===
Maharashtrian Brahmins have played a significant role in the Hindu nationalist movement. Christophe Jaffrelot, a political scientist, states that even in Indore (a city in Madhya Pradesh), from 1950 to 1965, Maharashtrian Brahmins and CKP together accounted for two-third or three-fourth of the Hindu nationalist representation in the municipal councils.

Jaffrelot thinks that Brahmins are still resented by the Marathas and Dalits of Maharashtra despite no longer having much political power.

=== Anti-Brahmin Violence ===
After Gandhi's murder by Nathuram Godse, himself a Chitpavan Brahmin; Brahmins in Maharashtra, in 1948, became targets of violence, mostly by some elements from the Maratha caste. V. M. Sirsikar, a political scientist at the University of Pune, noted that

It will be too much to believe that the riots took place because of the intense love of Gandhiji on the part of the Marathas. Godse became a very convenient hate symbol to damn the Brahmins and burn their properties.

Another political scientist, Donald B. Rosenthal, said that the motivation for the violence was the historical discrimination and humiliation faced by the Maratha community due to their caste status and "Even today, local Brahmins claim that the Marathas organized the riots to take political advantage of the situation".

In Satara alone, about 1000 houses were burnt in about 300 villages. There were "cruel, cold-blooded killings" as well – for example, one family whose last name happened to be 'Godse' had three of its male members killed. Brahmins suffered from serious physical violence as well as economic violence in the form of looting. In Sangli, Jains and Lingayats joined the Marathas in their attacks against the Brahmins. Thousands of offices and homes were also set on fire. Molestation incidents were also reported during these attacks. On the first day alone, the number of deaths in Bombay were 15, and 50 in Pune. The total monetary loss has been estimated to Rs.100 million (or about 20 million in 1948 US dollars).

=== Reservation Demands in Maharashtra ===
Brahmins (8-10% of Maharashtra), under the group Samast Brahmin Samaj have protested in Mumbai, Pune & Sambhaji Nagar been put forth 15 demands including "additional 4% reservations under EWS" and a fixed pension of Rs.5000 for their community citing the 'rise of economical backwardness amongst them and unemployment with only have 120 days of work'.

== Notable people ==
- Notable Deshastha Brahmins
- Notable Chitpavan Brahmins
- Notable Karhade Brahmins

== Bibliography ==
- Eaton, Richard Maxwell (2015). The Sufis of Bijapur, 1300-1700: Social Roles of Sufis in Medieval India. Princeton University Press. ISBN 9781400868155.
