= East Asian Economic Review =

- Discipline: International economics
- Language: English
- Edited by: Chul Chung

Publication details
- Former name(s): Journal of International Economic Studies, Journal of East Asian Economic Integration
- History: 1997–present
- Publisher: Korea Institute for International Economic Policy (South Korea)
- Frequency: Quarterly

Standard abbreviations
- ISO 4: East Asian Econ. Rev.

Indexing
- ISSN: 2508-1640 (print); 2508-1667 (web)
- LCCN: 2012212026
- OCLC no.: 806235108

Links
- Journal homepage; Online archive

The East Asian Economic Review is a quarterly peer-reviewed academic journal on economics and the economy of East Asia. It is published by the Korea Institute for International Economic Policy and was established in 1997 as the Journal of International Economic Studies and renamed Journal of East Asian Economic Integration in 2012, obtaining its current title in 2016. The editor-in-chief is Chul Chung (Korea Institute for International Economic Policy).

== Abstracting and indexing ==
The East Asian Economic Review is indexed and abstracted in EconLit, e-JEL, JEL on CD, ESCI, OCLC WorldCat, ProQuest, Google Scholar, ECONIS, EconBiz, EBSCO Academic Search Premier, British Library and SSRN, Emerging Sources Citation Index (ESCI), Directory of Open Access Scholarly Resource(ROAD) and registered to Ulrichsweb, ITS·MARC, CrossRef and Korea Citation Index.

== Outstanding paper award ==
The journal gives a yearly Award for Excellence for an outstanding paper published in the journal. The award includes a KRW 5,000,000 prize and a detailed one- to two-page nomination statement describing how the selected paper has contributed to the knowledge of international economics.
