= Bargir Bakshi Balaji Rao =

Second Diwan of Mysore

2nd Diwan of Mysore
- In office April 1811 – January 1812
- Monarch: Krishnaraja Wadiyar III
- Preceded by: Purnaiah
- Succeeded by: Savar Bakshi Rama Rao

Personal details
- Occupation: Administrator

Bargir Bakshi Balaji Rao was the second Diwan of Mysore from April 1811 to January 1812 to Maharaja Krishnaraja Wodeyar III. Bakshi Balaji Rao was the immediate successor to Purnaiya and was succeeded by Savar Bakshi Rama Rao in February 1812. Before being appointed as the Diwan, Bakshi Balaji Rao served as Karnik under Haidar Ali and Tipu Sultan at Devanahalli and Madhugiri and later was promoted as Bakshi. He was also the shanubhog of Kysapura, Doddaganagavadi, Ibbalikehalli, Chowdaeshwarei Halli, Yerehalli, Arehalli, and other surrounding villages of Closepet (Ramanagara). Later he became the Prime Minister of Mysore Kingdom.
