= P. N. Krishnamurti =

Indian lawyer

Sir Purniah Narsinga Rao Krishnamurti KCIE
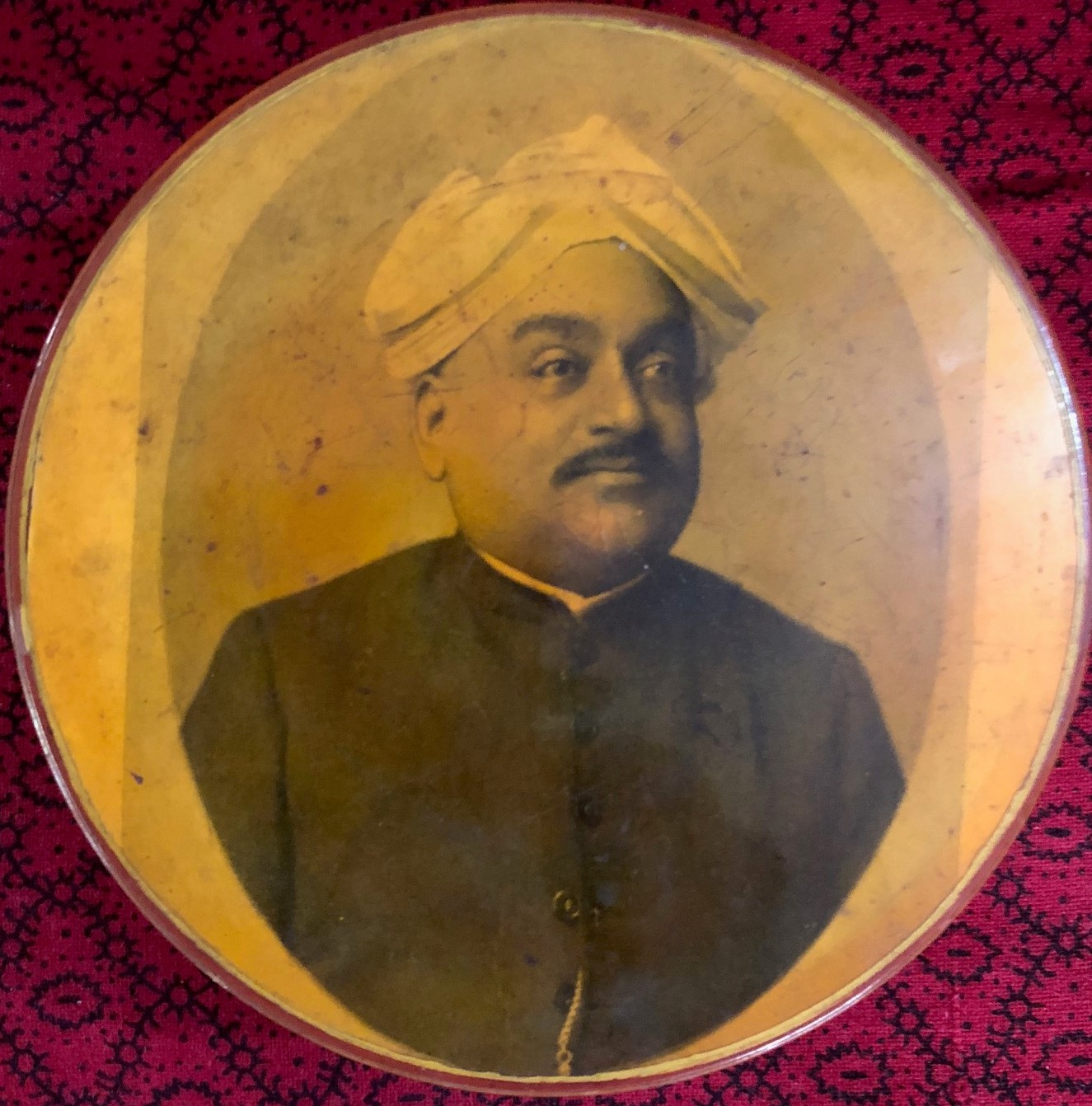

16th Dewan of Mysore
- In office 1901–1906
- Monarch: Krishna Raja Wadiyar IV
- Preceded by: T. R. A. Thumboo Chetty
- Succeeded by: V. P. Madhava Rao

Personal details
- Born: 12 August 1849 Mysore kingdom
- Died: 1911 (aged 61–62)
- Profession: Lawyer, civil servant

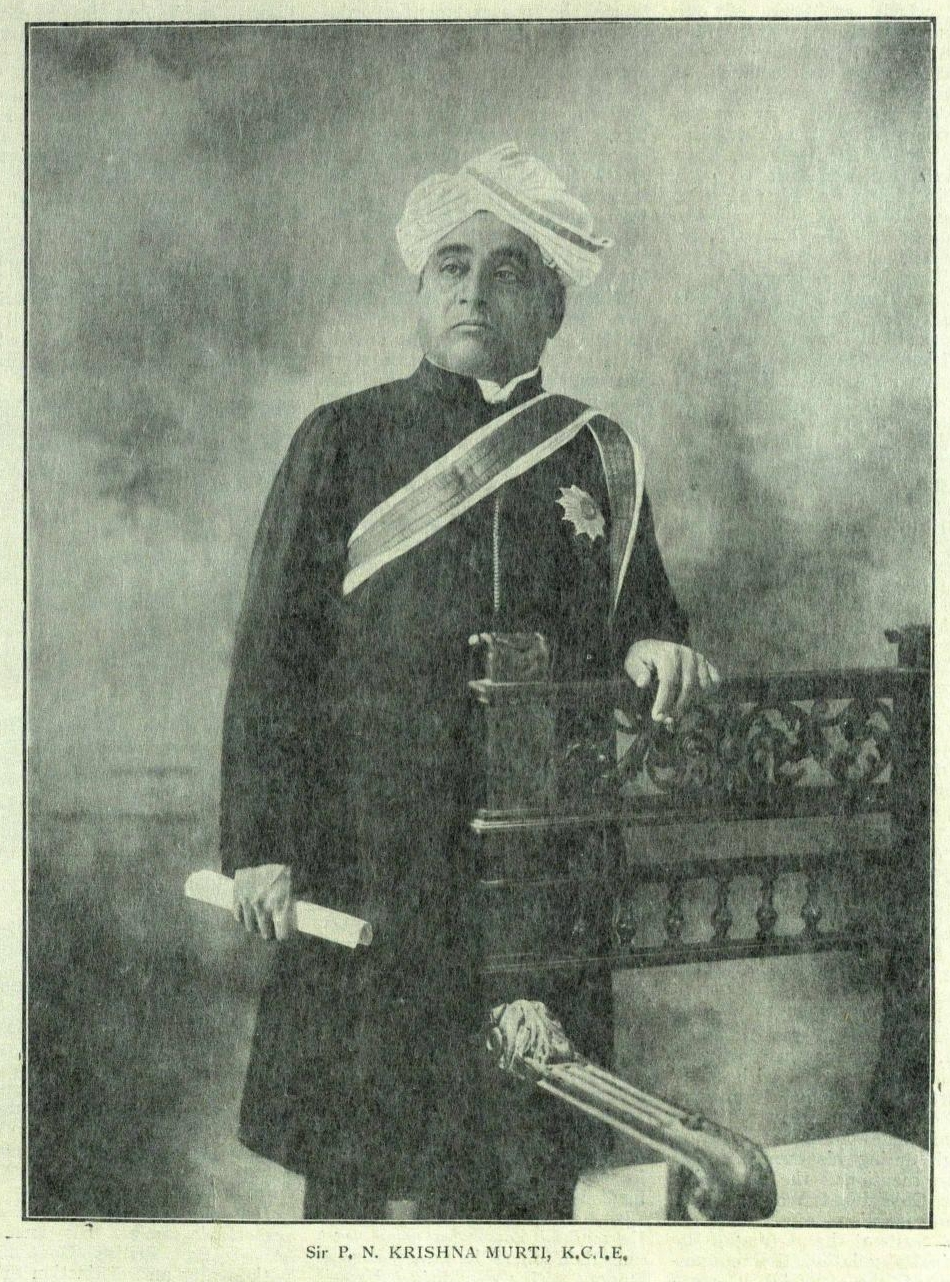
P. N. Krishnamurti

Sir Purniah Narasinga Rao Krishnamurti, KCIE (12 August 1849 – 1911) was an Indian lawyer and administrator who served as the 16th Dewan of Mysore from 1901 to 1906. He was the great-great grandson of Purnaiah, the first dewan of Mysore.

== Early life and education ==
Krishnamurti was born on 12 August 1849 in the Kingdom of Mysore and was educated at Bangalore. He graduated in law from the University of Madras and joined Mysore Civil Service as Assistant Superintendent in 1870 during Mysore Commission. After the restoration of the throne to the Wadiyar dynasty, Krishnamurti served as a judge of the Chief Court of Mysore before being appointed Dewan in 1901. On 3 August 1905, whilst he was dewan, public electric lighting was introduced in Bangalore, becoming the first city in India to get electric street lighting. He was also the fifth Jagirdar of Yelandur estate.

He had two children.

== Awards and honours ==
In 1897, Krishnamurti was made a Companion of the Order of the Indian Empire (CIE). He was promoted to Knight Commander of the Order of the Indian Empire (KCIE) in the 1903 Durbar Honours.

=== Places in honour ===
Krishnamurthypuram, a locality in Mysore, is named after him.
