= Devrukhe Brahmin =

Maharashtrian Brahmin sub-caste

Devrukhe Brahmins are one of the sub-castes of Marathi speaking Brahmins like the Deshastha, Chitpavan and Karhade Brahmins.

== Introduction ==
The Devrukhe Brahmins are also called "Devarshi Brahmins". Bombay published a 16-page pamphlet in Marathi giving information about their community.

=== Origins ===
Tracing the origins of Devrukhe Brahmins, it leads to one of the oldest Marathi speaking Brahmins in Maharashtra–Deshastha Brahmin, residents of Desha i.e. over the Western Ghats. During the end of 15th century–a period marked by famine and turmoils of Mughal rule, many Brahmin families descended the Western Ghats and settled near Sangameshwar–Devrukh, Ratnagiri. Later they were called as Devrukhe Brahmins. They follow the same traditions as of other Maharashtrian Brahmins along with the influences that may have resulted due to migration near Ratnagiri.

== Intercaste disputes ==
In 1583, The Chitpavans challenged the Brahmin status of "Konkana Devarshi Brahmins". This issue reached Kashi Pandits, they did not affirm nor reject the Brahmin status as the detailed scenario of this Brahmins were not traceable. The author mentions the incidence where the local Brahmins denied to dine With devrukhe. In 1657, the Kashi Pandits were referred regarding the ritual status of Devarshi/Devrukhe, this time the Kashi Pandits granted them Brahmins status. In 1723, During Peshwa rule, the Brahmins ritual status of Devrukhe was challenged by local Brahmins. They were declared unfit to dine with the Brahmins comparing them with "devarastriyas", the decision was headed by pandits of Satara and local Adavaitha mutt. In 1749, Devrukhe consulted Pandits of Kashi who visited Maharashtra, Pandits declared them as Brahmins as Kashi Pandits were highest authority for decisions related to varnas.

== See also ==
- Hinduism
- Indian caste system
