= Purnaiah =

Prime Minister of Mysore

Mir Mian Krishnacharya Purniya
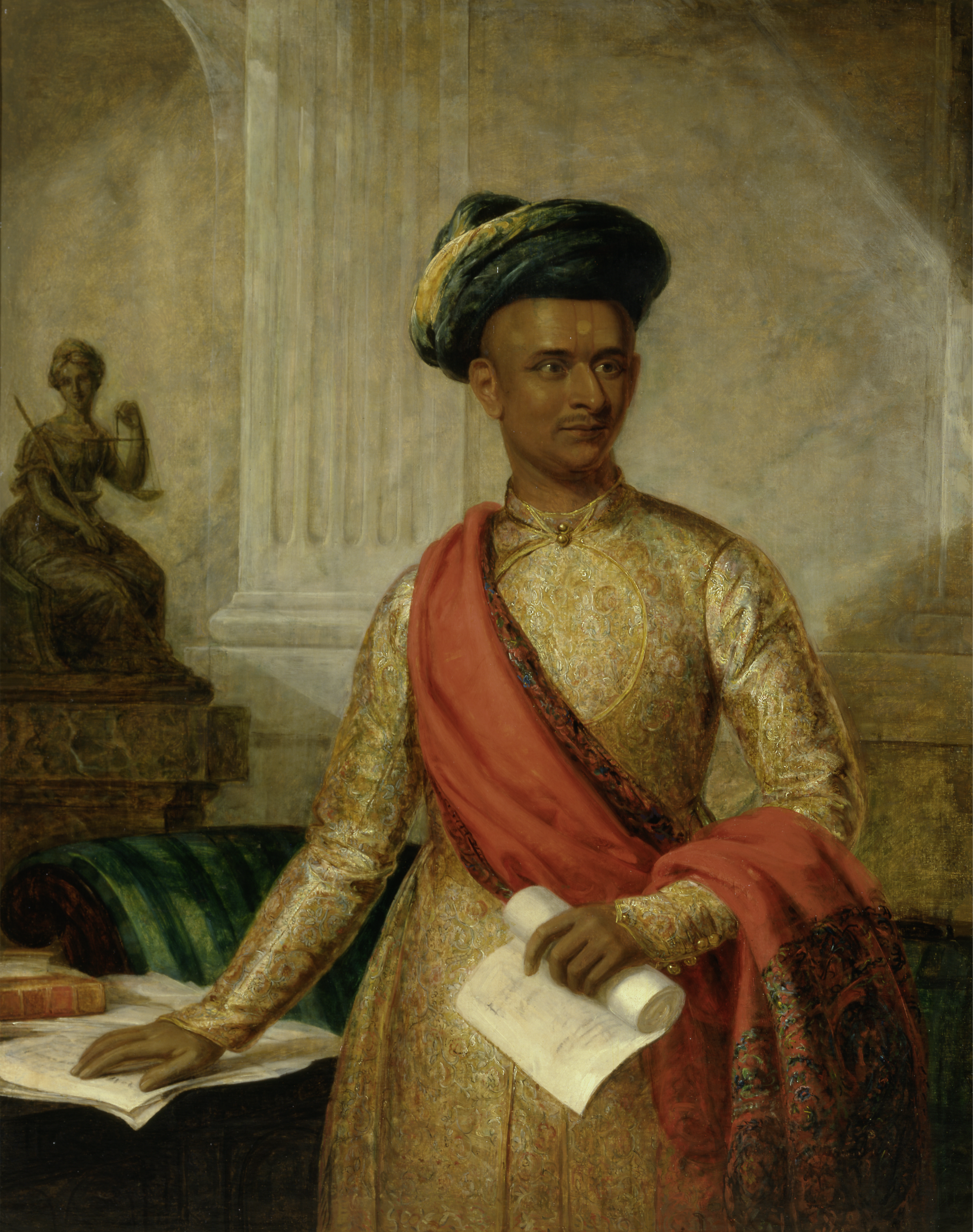
- Portrait by Thomas Hickey, 1801

1st Dewan of Mysore
- In office 10 December 1782 – 4 May 1799
- Monarch: Tipu Sultan
- In office 30 June 1799 – 23 December 1811
- Monarch: Krishnaraja Wodeyar III
- Succeeded by: Bargir Bakshi Balaji Rao

Personal details
- Born: 1746 Kunjimedu, Carnatic state
- Died: 27 March 1812 (aged 65–66) Srirangapatna, Kingdom of Mysore
- Occupation: Administrator

Military service
- Branch/service: Kingdom of Mysore
- Years of service: 1782–1811
- Rank: Dewan
- Unit: Rocket Utility
- Battles/wars: Third Anglo-Mysore War; Fourth Anglo-Mysore War; Siege of Seringapatam; Battle of Sultanpet Tope

Krishnacharya Purnaiah (1746 – 27 March 1812), popularly known as Dewan Purnaiah, was an Indian administrator, statesman, and military strategist who served as the first dewan of Mysore from 1782 to 1811. He was instrumental in the restoration of the rule of the Kingdom of Mysore to the Wadiyar dynasty. After the death of Tipu, he continued to advice Lakshmi Devi, the queen regent to the newly installed monarch Krishnaraja Wodeyar III.

Purnaiah was known for his accounting skills, prodigious memory, and proficiency in several languages. He was also a wartime military commander while serving under Tipu. After Tipu's defeat, he served as the dewan to Krishnaraja Wodeyar III. Wodeyar was educated and mentored by Purnaiah in the latter's early years .

== Early life ==
Krishnacharya Purniah was born in 1746. He was fluent in Kannada, Marathi, Sanskrit, and Persian. He understood English but could not read or write the language.

At the age of eleven, Purnaiah lost his father and had to seek employment to support his family. He started writing accounts at a trader's shop. This grocer had close contact with a rich merchant, Annadana Shetty, who supplied large quantities of groceries to Hyder Ali's palace and army.

== Dewan of Mysore ==
Purniah earned the confidence of Hyder Ali thanks to his aptitude in accounting and excellent handwriting. Endowed with prodigious memory, proficiency in multiple languages, and sheer hard work, Purniah became the head of the accounting department, and minister, and a confidant and close advisor of the ruler. Hyder Ali also granted Purnaiah a jagir in Maralahalli, Mysore. From then on, many of the ruler’s decisions, including political matters, were shaped by Purnaiah’s counsel.

=== Premiership under Tipu ===
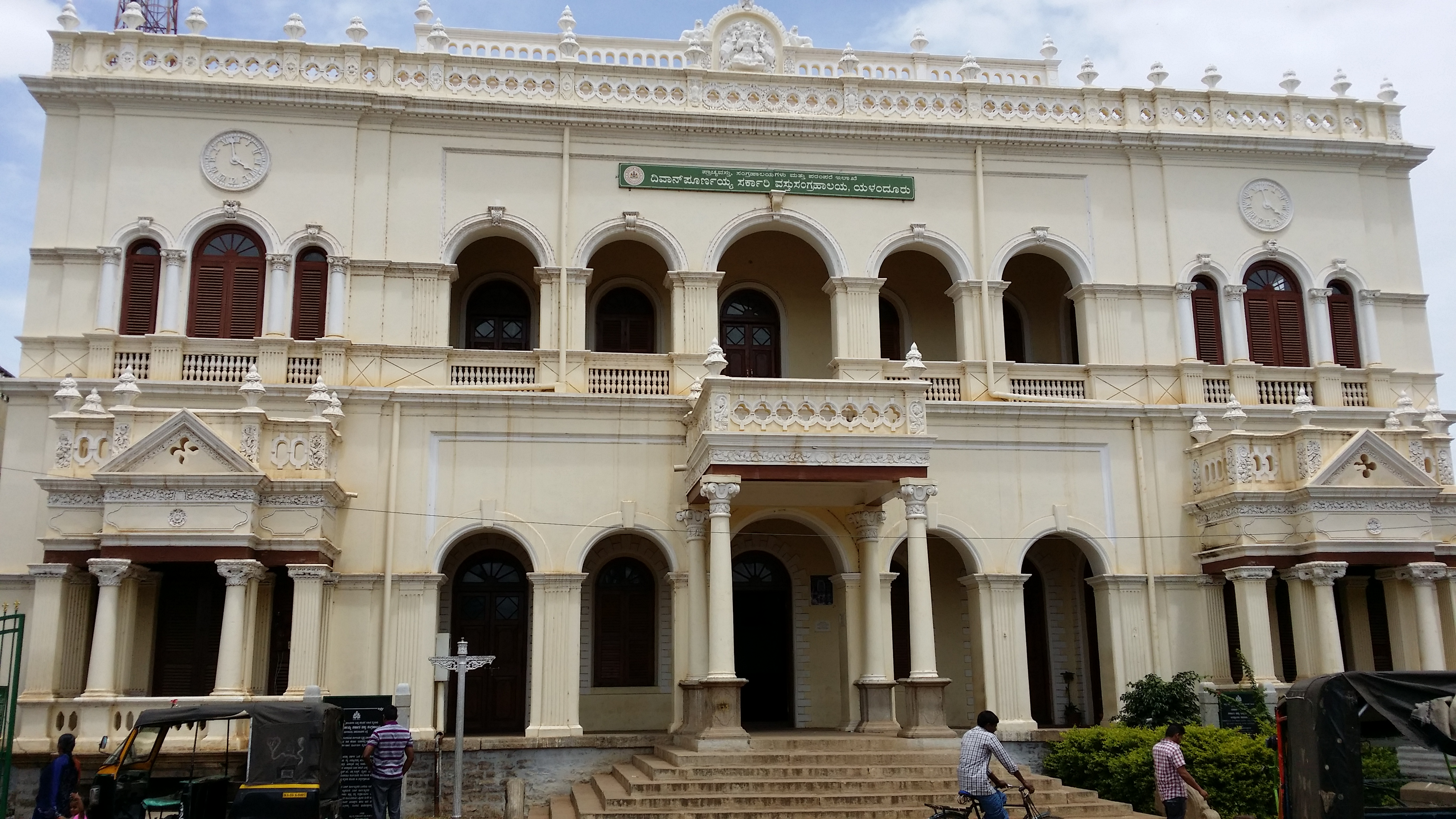
Residence built by Purniah in Yelandur, now a museum.

When Hyder Ali died near Chittoor in 1782, his son Tipu was encamping in the Malabar coast. Purniah kept Ali's death a top secret and sent the word only to Tipu by the speediest way possible. Meanwhile, Ali's body was kept embalmed, and business went on as usual. Purniah thus played a key role in keeping the news of Ali's death confidential owing to adversaries who could have seized this advantage and tried to usurp power. Purniah thus paved the way for the succession of Tipu. He soon became a member of Tipu's inner cabinet, eventually being labelled Dewan for the first time.

=== Premiership under the Wodeyars ===
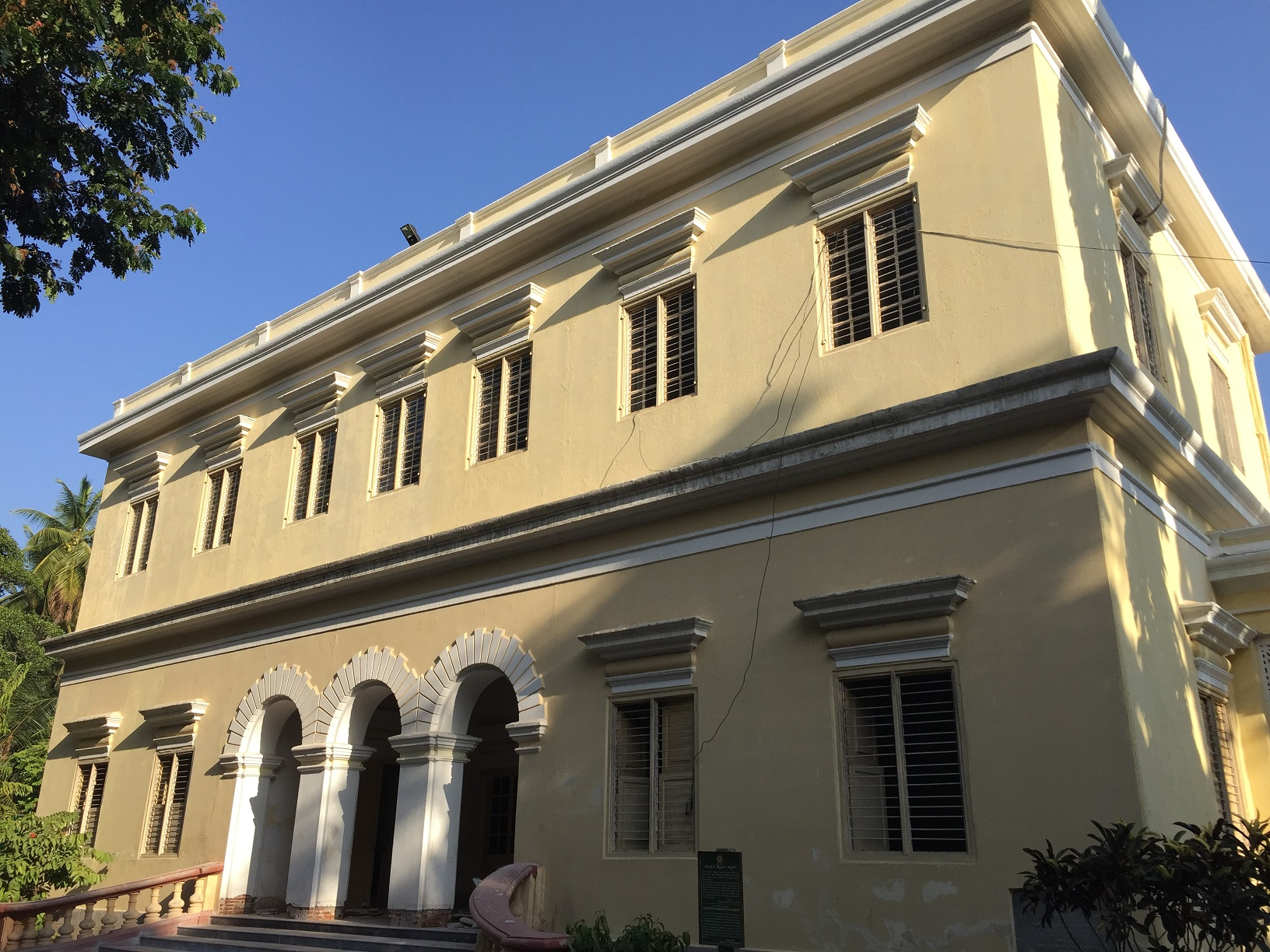
Lord Harris Residence, later residence of Puraniah after retirement. Seringapatam

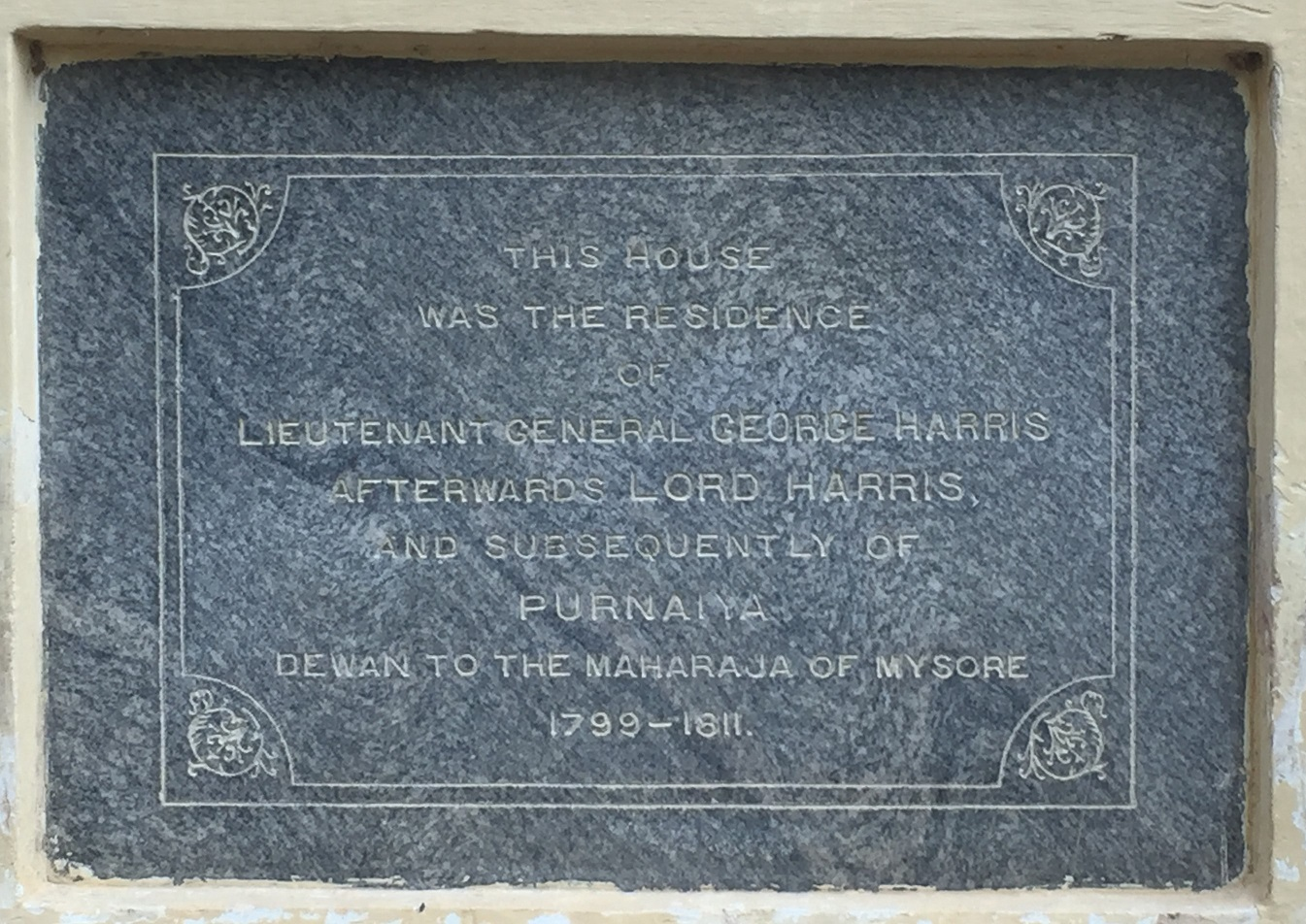
Inscription at the Lord Harris Residence, Seringapatam

After a series of wars with the British East India Company, Tipu was defeated in the fourth one and was killed in 1799. Soon, with lobbying efforts from Maharani Lakshmi Devi, Purniah met with George Harris, the commander-in-chief of the Madras Army, for the handing-over of the kingdom's government to the deposed Wadiyars. A subsidiary alliance was struck, and the maharani became the Queen Regent of Mysore for the infant prince Krishnaraja Wodeyar III. Purniah became the regent's adviser and educated and trained the young prince. On 27 December 1807, in recognition of his services, the queen regent awarded Purnaiah the feudal estate of Yelandur.

Krishnaraja Wodeyar III attained the age of 16 in early 1810, reaching the recognised age of discretion. Consequently, the British Resident of Mysore Arthur Cole invested the kingship in the prince in 1811. Purnaiah continued to advise the new maharaja for a brief period before retiring that year. The presiding Resident John Malcolm honoured him on his retirement by presenting him a horse, an elephant, and a rich killat. He was also honoured with handsome grants and a large pension for his services.

== Military career ==
Purniah participated in every military campaign led by Tipu. In the Third Anglo-Mysore War of 1792, he commanded a rocket unit comprising 131 men. During the Battle of Seringapatam, Tipu had entrusted his eldest son and heir-apparent to Purniah's care. In the Fourth Anglo-Mysore War, Purniah commanded the forces of Mysore against East India Company in a few battles including the Battle of Sultanpet Tope.

After Tipu's defeat at the hands of Arthur Wellesley, Purniah and Wellesley became closely associated when the latter was stationed in Mysore. Robert Frykenberg suggests that Wellesley learned how to maximise the utility of cavalry from Purniah.

== Administration ==
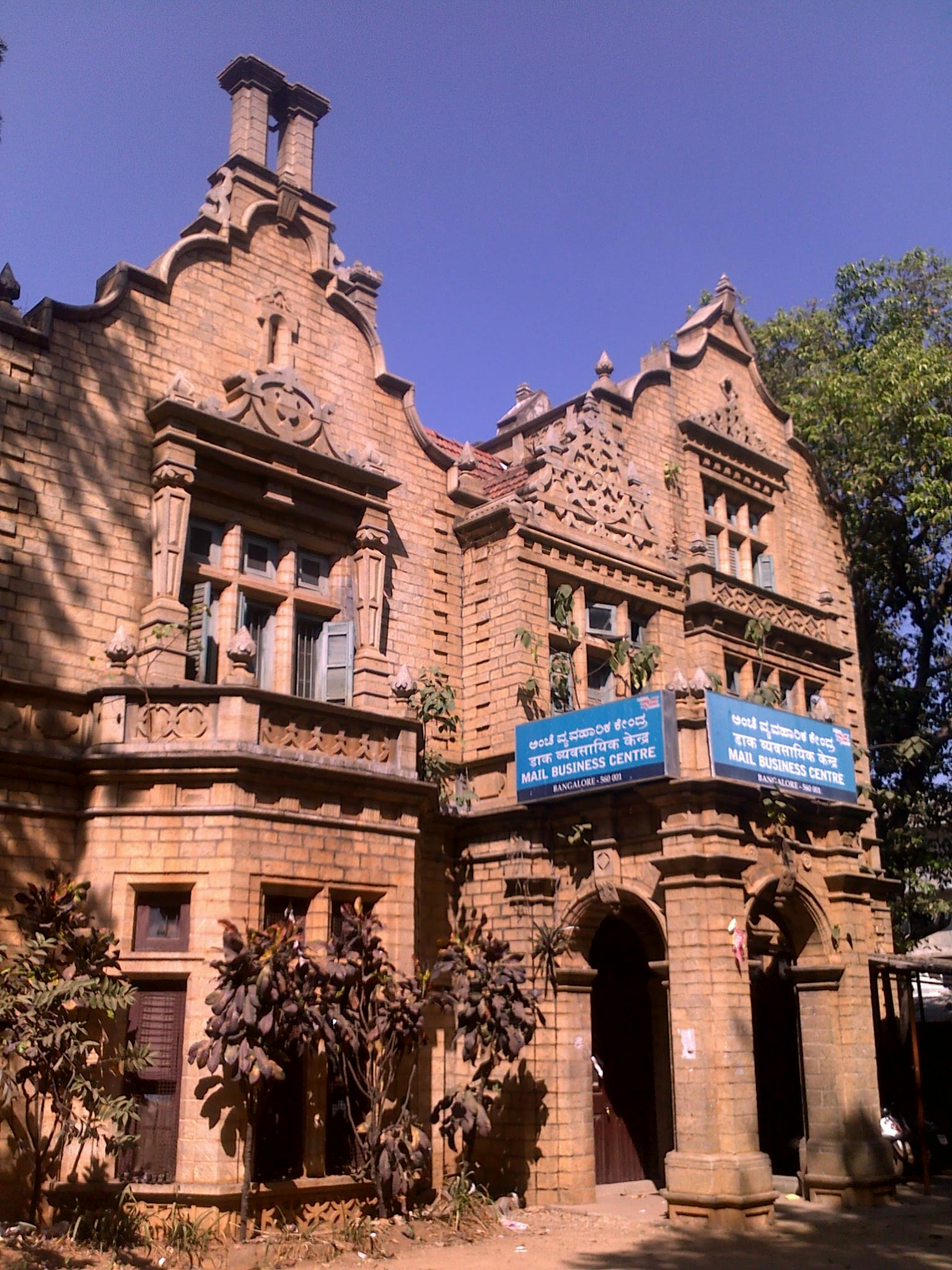
The home of Purnaiah's descendants in Bangalore

After Tipu's death in 1799, he suppressed the revolting local chieftains who had become despots.

Under Maharaja Krishnaraja Wodeyar III, Purnaiah started releasing cash allowances to mathas, temples, and dargahs, which had stopped under the Company rule after Tippu's death. He opened a judicial department to hear peoples' grievances. His public works have left a great legacy. About a nine-mile canal and several tanks were dug to supply drinking water to the city of Mysore. In honour of Richard Wellesley, the Governor-General of Bengal, a stone bridge was constructed across the river Kaveri connecting Srirangapattana with Kirangur. His work to improve agriculture was also acknowledged.

A large number of public shelters open to locals and travellers were erected in the name of Krishnaraja Wodeyar III, which were known as "Dewan Purniah".

Revenue administration was streamlined: the kingdom had a volatile border with incessant skirmishes, a legacy of the previous regime. Methodical land surveys were conducted; borders were notified; and the posts of shekdars, amaldars, and tehsildars (tax officers) were created, positions that are still in force throughout modern South Asia.

== Family ==
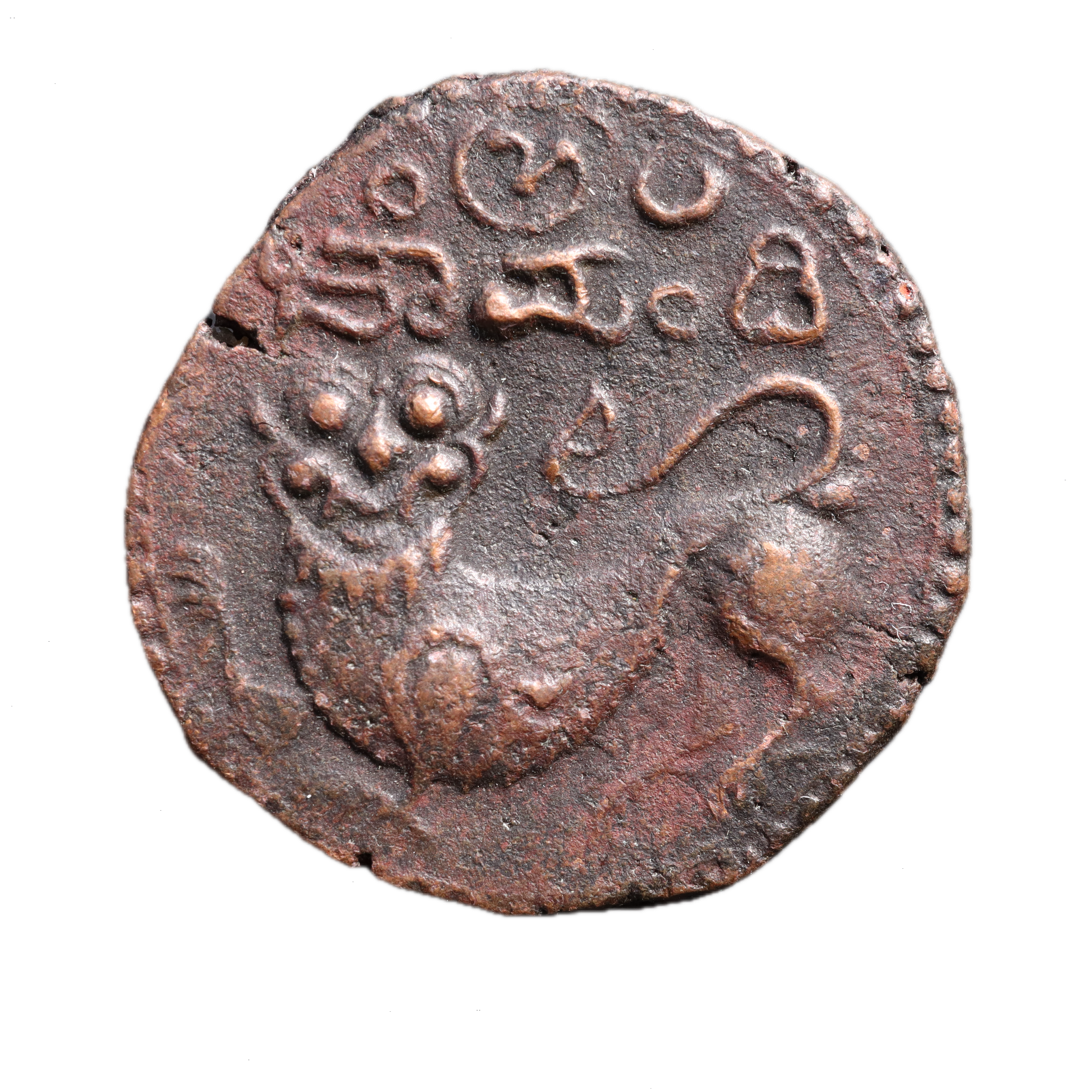
The obverse depicts "Sardula," a mythological tiger, facing right with its right paw and tail raised, accompanied by Kannada inscriptions at the top.

Purnaiah's family were devout followers of the Uttaradi Matha and the Dvaita philosophy of Madhvacharya. Religion and spirituality were very important to Purnaiah. He was a contemporary and disciple of Satyadharma Tirtha of the Uttaradi Matha.

Purnaiah's great-great grandson was Sir P. N. Krishnamurti, a lawyer and the 16th dewan of Mysore.

== Death ==
After his retirement in 1811, Purnaiah settled at his residence (formerly known as Lord Harris's House and the Doctor's Bungalow, located near Scott’s Bungalow and Garrison Cemetery) in Srirangapatna. A tablet on the wall of this house records the connection of Harris and Puraniah to this house. A year later, he died in the residence on 27 March 1812.

== Legacy ==
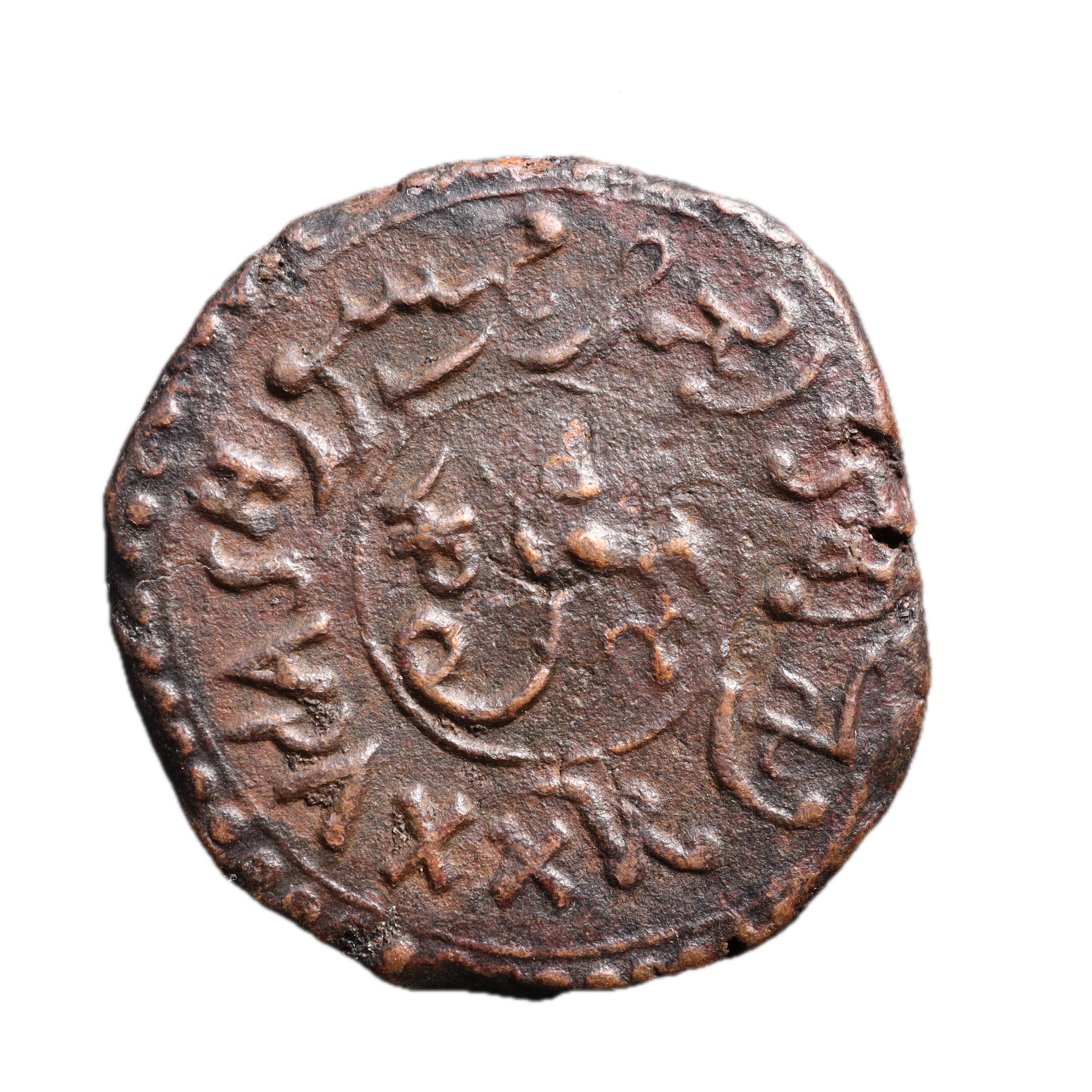
The reverse is notable for featuring inscriptions in both Kannada and Persian, as well as the coin's denomination in English using Roman numerals (XV Cash).

In 2013, a museum to map Purnaiah's achievements was opened at his former residence in Yelandur by the Department of Archaeology, Museums and Heritage.

== In popular culture ==
=== Films and television ===
- In 1988, Vijay Kashyap portrayed Purnaiah in the television serial Bharat Ek Khoj
- In 1990, Anant Mahadevan portrayed Purnaiah in the television series The Sword of Tipu Sultan
