= Ashta Pradhan =

Council of ministers in the Maratha empire

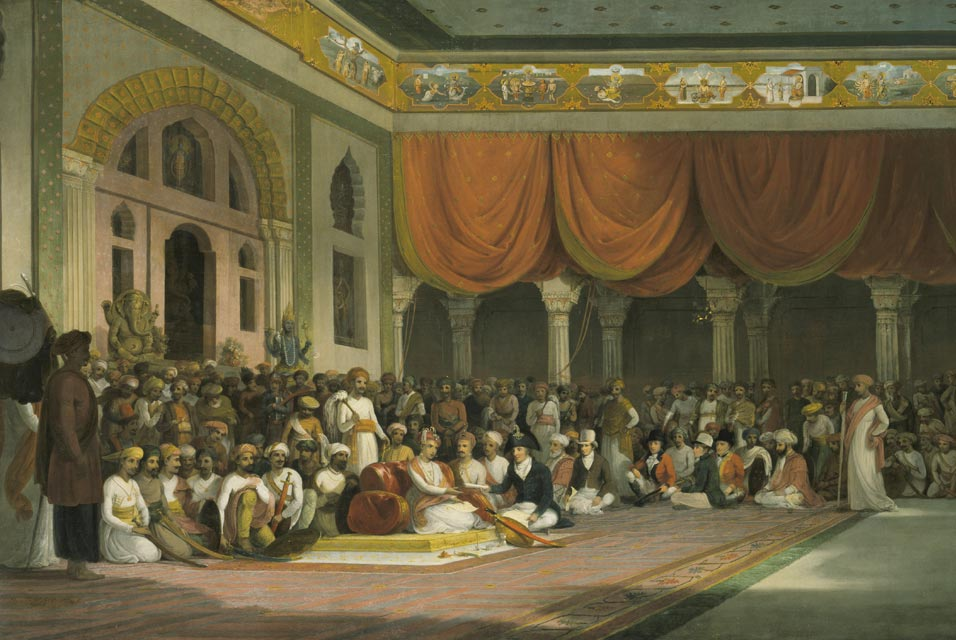
Durbar of Peshwa Madhavrao II in Pune by Thomas Daniell c. 1790

Ashta Pradhan (literally, 'Council of Eight') was the cabinet of the Maratha Empire. They are credited with having implemented good governance practices in the Maratha heartland, as well as for the success of the military campaigns against the Mughal Empire.

== Constitution ==
The coronation of Shivaji was held in 1674, at the Raigad Fort in the present-day Indian state of Maharashtra. On that occasion, Shivaji formalized the institution of a council of eight ministers to guide the administration of his nascent state. This council came to be known as the Ashta Pradhan. Each of the ministers was placed in charge of an administrative department; thus, the council heralded the birth of a bureaucracy.

The formalization of an administrative mechanism was of a piece with other measures, indicative of the formalization of a sovereign state, which were implemented on the occasion of Shivaji's coronation: coinage bearing his insignia (the copper Shivrai and the gold hon) were issued, and a new era, the Rajyabhishek era, was proclaimed on the occasion.

== Composition ==
The Ashta Pradhan was designed to encompass all primary administrative functions of the state, with each minister being given charge of a role in the administration. Ministerial designations were drawn from Sanskrit; the eight ministerial roles were as follows:

- Pantpradhan or Peshwa - Prime Minister, general administration of the Empire. Moropant Trimbak Pingle was the first Peshwa appointed by Shivaji.
- Amatya or Mujumdar - Finance Minister, managing accounts of the Empire. In 1662 Nilo Sondeo was appointed as Mujumdar. In 1674, at the coronation ceremony, the post was renamed Amatya and the title was solely bestowed upon Ramchandra Pant Amatya.
- Shurunavis or Sachiv - Secretary, preparing royal edicts. In 1662 Annaji Datto Sachiv was appointed as Shurunavis/Sachiv.
- Waqia-Navis - Interior Minister, managing internal affairs including intelligence and espionage.
- Sar-i-Naubat or Senapati - Commander-in-chief, managing the forces and defence of the Empire. Netaji Palkar was appointed as the first Senapati. The most famous Senapati in that era was Hambirrao Mohite.
- Sumant or Dabir - foreign affairs, to manage relationships with other sovereigns. First Dabir was Sonopant Vishwanath Dabir who was sent by Shahaji to help Shivaji and Jijabai in Pune. After Sonopant, his son Trimbakpant Sono Dabir was appointed as Dabir and following his death, Ramchandra Trimbakpant Dabir succeeded him. When Shivaji donated the gold equal to his mother Jijabai's weight, he also donated the gold equal to Sonopant Dabir's weight at Mahabaleshwar. Sonopant Vishwanath Dabir is the only member to have held two posts, Dabir and Shurunavis.
- Nyayadhish - Chief Justice, dispensing justice on civil and criminal matters. The post of Nyayadish or Chief Justice was bestowed on Niraji Ravaji, father of Pralhad Niraji.
- Panditrao - High Priest, managing internal religious matters. The duties of the Panditrao were to promote learning in the Ashta Pradhan and watch over the interests of his officers. Raghunath Panditrao was given the post Panditrao.

Continued conflict with the Mughal Empire meant that military matters remained exceedingly important to the affairs of the nascent state. Hence, with the notable exception of the Panditrao and the Nyayadhish, the other pradhans held full-time military commands, and their deputies performed their civil duties in their absence. During the later era of the Maratha Empire, these deputies and their staff constituted the core of the Peshwa's bureaucracy.

== During Shivaji's rule ==
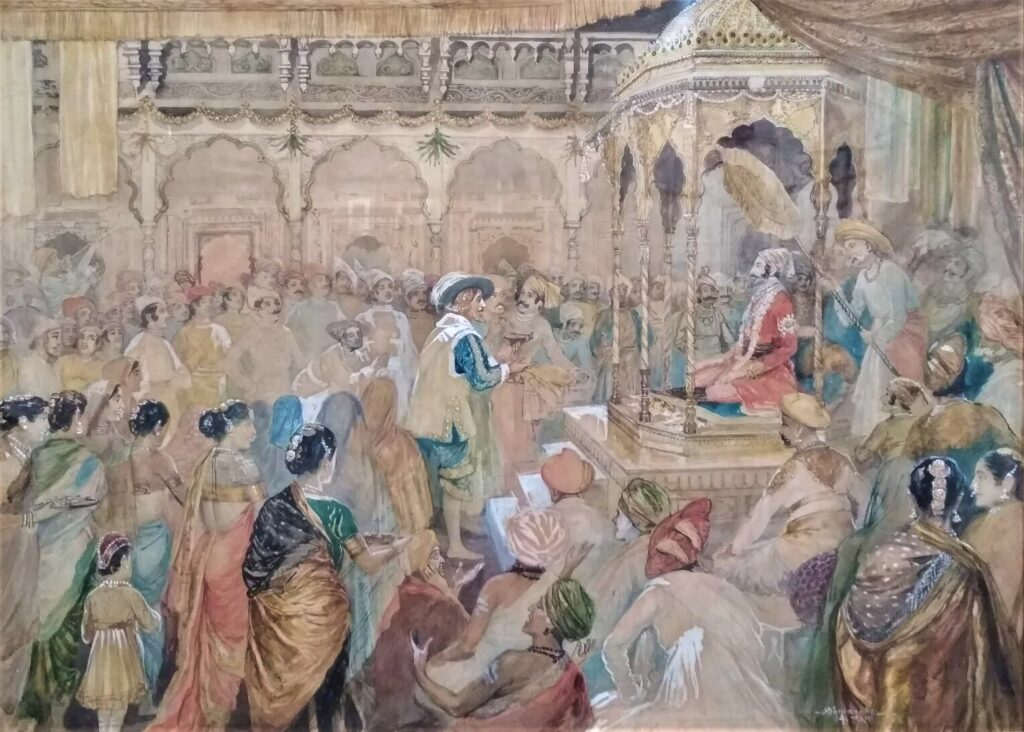
Coronation of Shivaji by M. V. Dhurandhar

Designation/Title	Office Holder	Appointment	Successor	Notes
Pantpradhan / Peshwa (Prime Minister)	Moropant Trimbak Pingle	1674	Moreshvar Pingale	
Amatya / Mujumdar (Finance Minister)	Nilo Sondeo	1662	Ramchandra Pant Amatya	
Shurunavis/Sacheev (Secretary)	Annaji Datto Sachiv	1662	Ragho Annaji	
Waqia-Navis (Interior Minister)	Dattoji Pant			
Sar-i-Naubat / Senapati (Commander-in-Chief)	Hambirao Mohite	1674	Mhaloji Ghorpade	
Sumant / Dabir - (Foreign Minister)	Sonopant Trimbakpant Dabir		Trimbakpant Dabir	
Nyayadhish (Chief Justice)	Niraji Ravaji		Pralhad Niraji	
Panditrao (High Priest)	Raghunathrao Panditrao		Moreshvar Raghunath	

== After Shivaji's rule ==
Shivaji's son Sambhaji, (ruled 1680–89) reduced the powers of the council. Gradually these positions became ceremonial and hereditary at court with nominal powers, if any. Beginning in 1714, the prime minister appointed by Shivaji's grandson, Shahu I slowly arrogated power. Within a short period, de facto control of the Maratha state passed to his family. This family of hereditary prime ministers retained the title of Peshwa. However, the Ashta Pradhan council was never revived to fill the functions it discharged for the last decade of Shivaji's reign.

== Positions equal to the Ashta Pradhan ==
- Chitnis

Also See: Khando Ballal

- Guptahere

Also see: Bahirji Naik

- Fadnavis
- Also see: Nana Fadnavis

== Miscellany ==
- The Ashta Pradhan is somewhat similar to the court arrangements of other famous emperors such as the Navaratnas of the courts of both Vikramaditya and Akbar, and also of the Astadiggajas of Krishnadevaraya's court.
- Lakshmana Sena, the ruler of the Sena dynasty had Pancharatnas .
- The Ashta Pradhan can be construed as an initiative to develop a second line of leadership in the state akin to the Khalsa by Guru Gobind Singh.
- A tradition states that Shivaji had been guided in the Shastra particularly Shukra-Niti in creation of the Ashta Pradhan.
