= Wada (house) =

Type of mansion in Western India

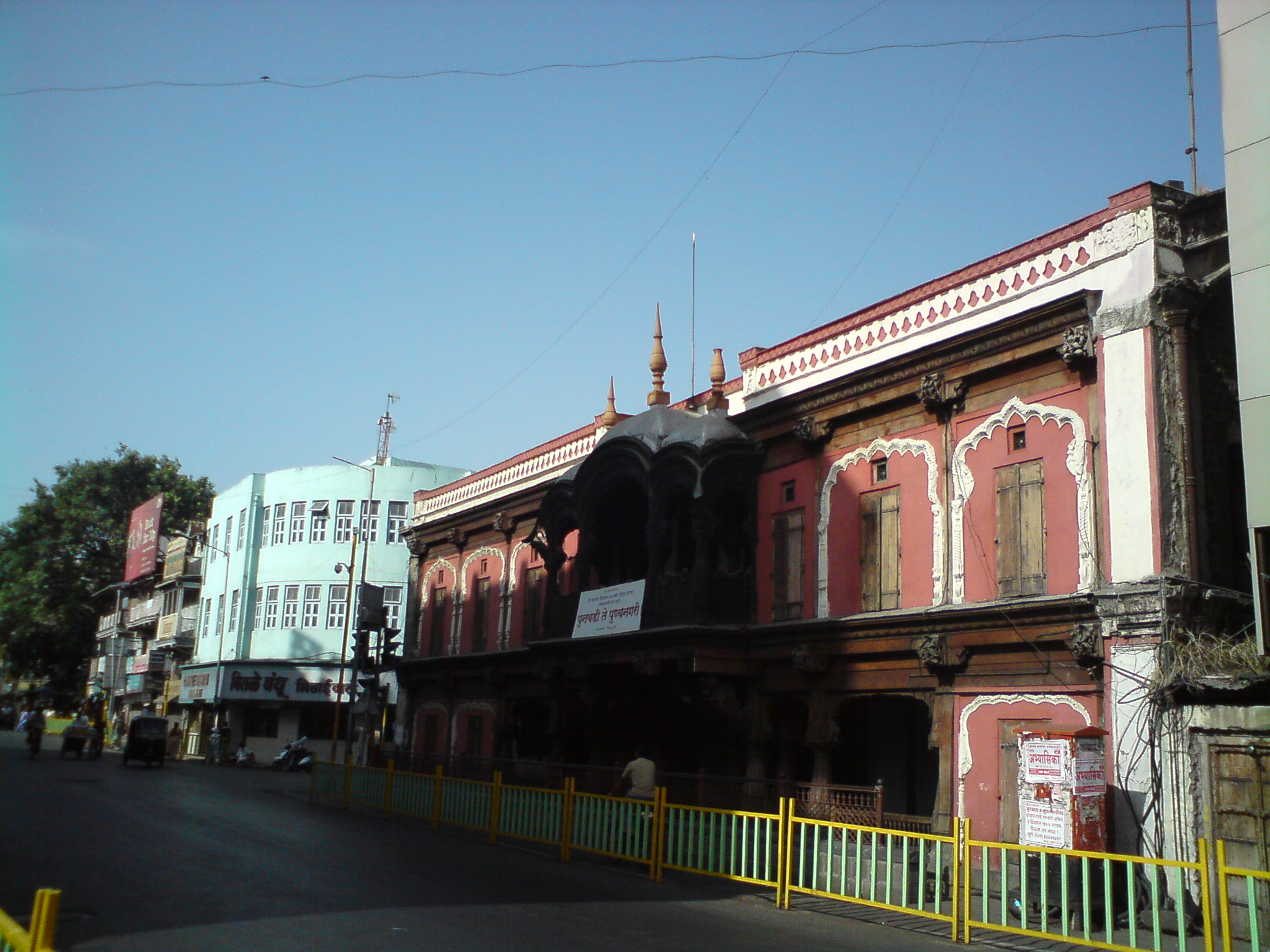
The Vishrambaag Wada

Wada is a type of dwelling found in Maharashtra, western India. Wada is a Marathi word for denoting a large mansion. The term, in all probability, is derived from the Sanskrit word Vata, meaning a plot or a piece of land meant for a house. Over time it came to denote the house built on that plot. Wadi, an extended meaning of wada, denotes a cluster of huts. Typically, wada refers to a house with courtyards found in Maharashtra and surrounding regions in India.

== Origin ==
The courtyard houses developed in medieval India and were prevalent all over the sub-continent, varying regionally, under different names. They were called Wada in Maharastra (western India), Haveli in Rajasthan (North India), Deori in Hyderabad (southern Indian plateau), Nalukettu in Kerala (southernmost coastal India), and Rajbadi in Bengal (east India).

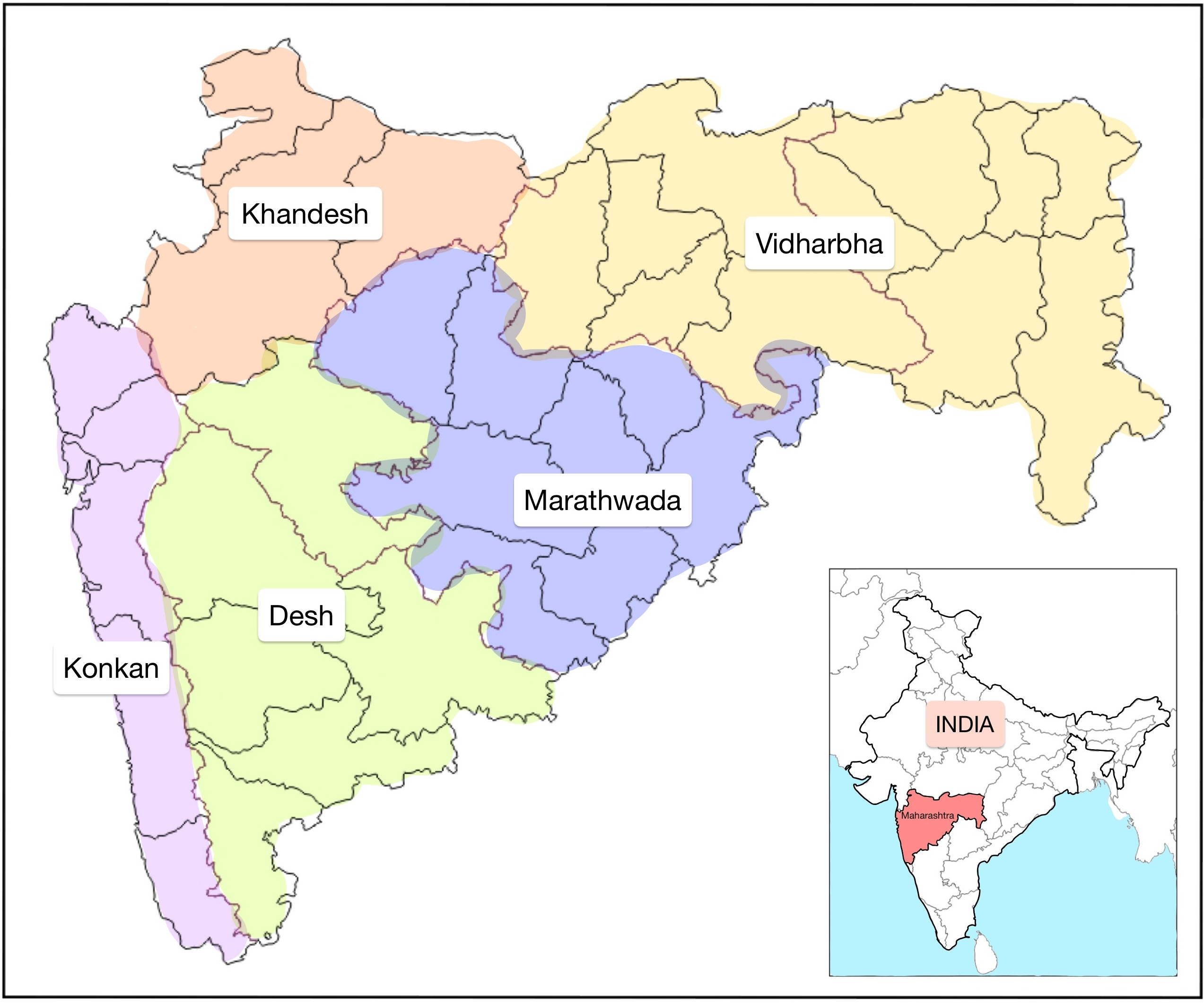
Regional map of Maharashtra state

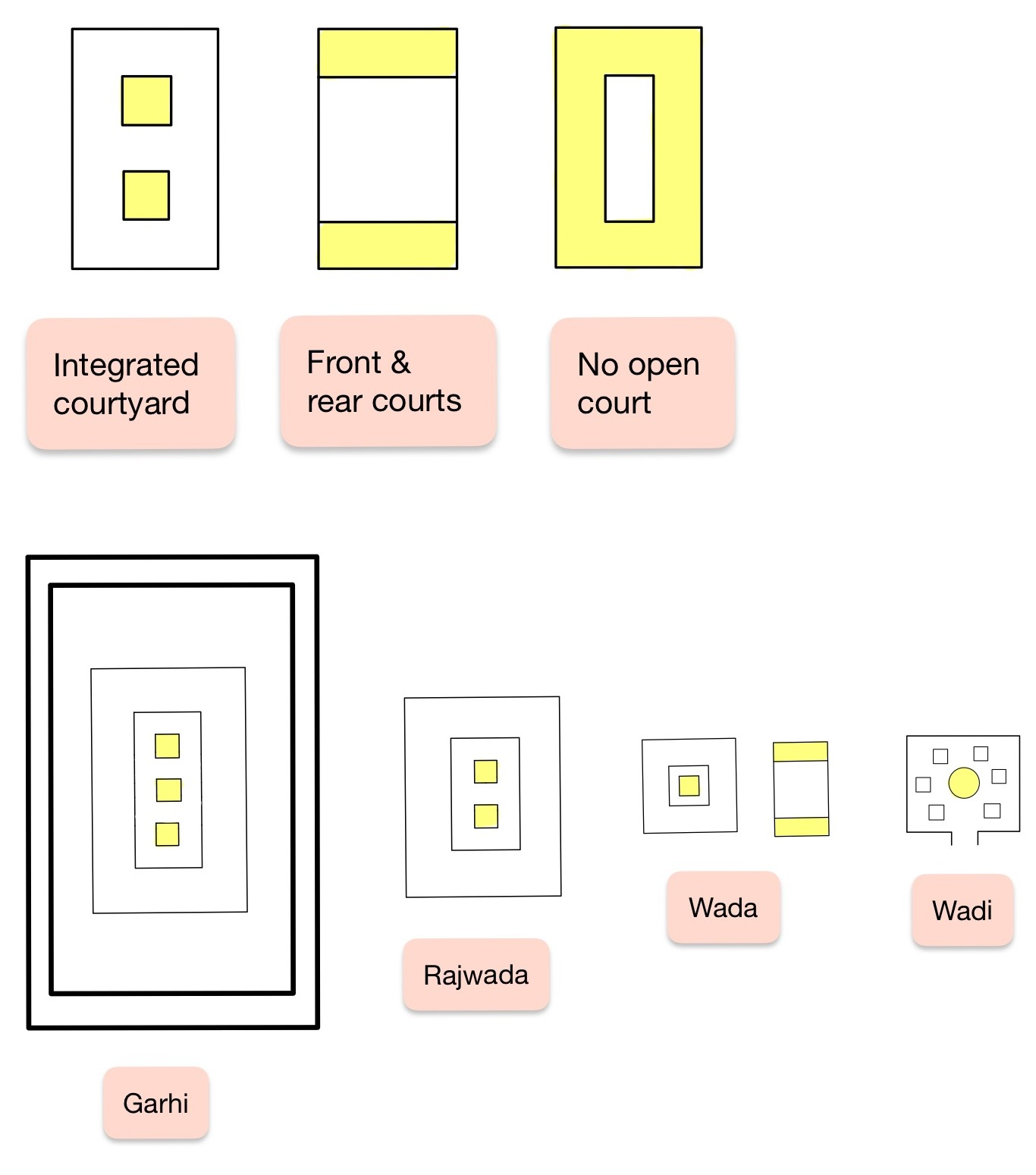
Types of wada houses

In Maharashtra, the wada house form received patronage from the Maratha rulers in the 17th century and later from the Peshwas and their successors. The latter were responsible for the sitewide spread and its expansion to the adjoining regions of Malwa, parts of Gujarat and Karnataka.

== Types of Wada ==
Size based

Garhis were fortified wadas with bastions and ramparts in the village's focus. The village or town grew around the Garhi with peripheral clusters of wada houses all around. They are introverted structures built in brick and stone with a series of courtyards inside. Examples are Shaniwar Wada in Pune, Holkar Wada in Chandwad, and Vafgaon.

Rajwada or Palace wada houses were also the central focus of the town but with the absence of bastions and ramparts. Examples are the Bhor Rajwada, with a single courtyard, and the Satara Rajwada, with two courtyards.

Smaller wada houses formed clusters around the nucleus of the town, which is either a Garhi or a Rajwada. While Garhi and Rajwada were isolated buildings built on larger areas, these houses were narrow buildings built along the streets with their narrow side facing the street and sharing walls with adjacent buildings.

There was another class of buildings, usually, poor rural dwellings called the wadi, with an extroverted structure with temporary boundaries merely existing to mark the boundary. The central space is not defined as in the other houses.

Courtyard based

Integrated open courtyard wada are the most popular ones with a courtyard in the center, semi-open spaces around it and then enclosed spaces. These are mostly Garhi or Rajwada types.

Front and rear yard type are the one with open courts in the front and back. These are the comman man's houses around the periphery of the Garhi or Rajwada.

Wada without an open integrated courtyard are a special type built in places with heavy rainfall like in the coastal Konkan region.

Location based spread

Most of the Garhi and Rajwada are found in the Desh and Vidharba regions, the center of power of the Peshwas. They were built with elaborate wooden carvings, three or four courtyards, four to five floors and a more diverse style, borrowing elements from the Rajput and the Islamic styles of architecture. The Konkan region, home to administrative noblemen, also had large wada but with little to no ornamentation. Khandesh and Marathwada regions, home to mercantile noblemen, had smaller houses with shared walls. Kahandesh had a mix of Gujarati architecture, since it bordered the Gujarat state.

== Settlement patterns ==
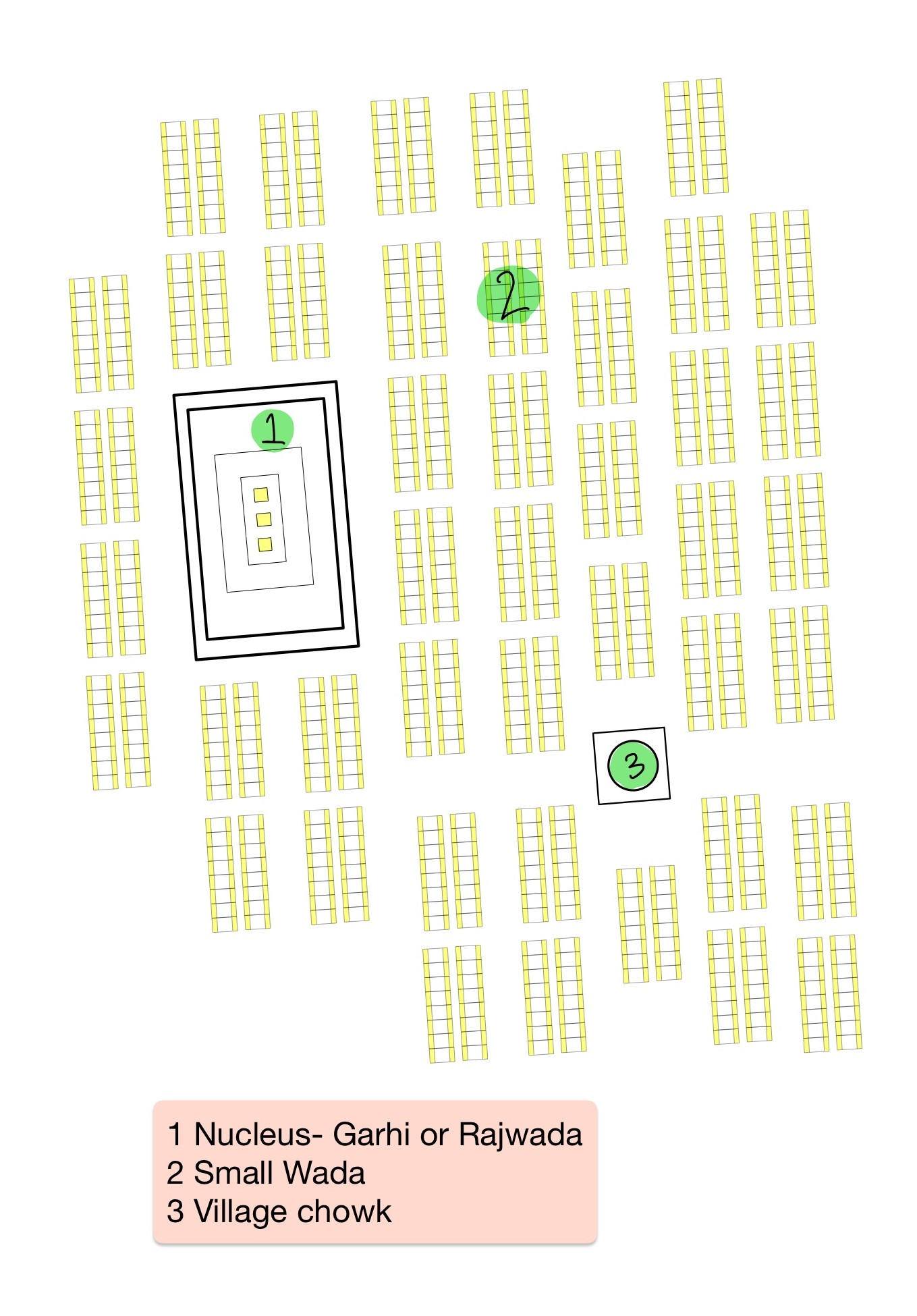
Town Planning

Wada houses typically have an introverted blueprint with a courtyard at its core. Several wada houses formed residential clusters known as peths in Pune or pol in Ahmedabad or mohallas in north India. These clusters enclosed within a perimeter wall would have wells, temples or places of worship, and chowks within them. Just like a house has a ‘chowk’, i.e. the courtyard, at the cluster level there would be a chowk within a group of smaller wadas which are spaces for social activities in the community. These spaces didn't have a particular function, rather, activities just spilled out here. It is this outdoor usage of space, from a climatological and social point of view, that necessitated the courtyard being formally integrated into the built form. The chowk of the village usually has a tree with a low platform (paar) around it. This facilitated the conglomeration of people for religious congregation and an open air sit out.

== Building indoor layout ==
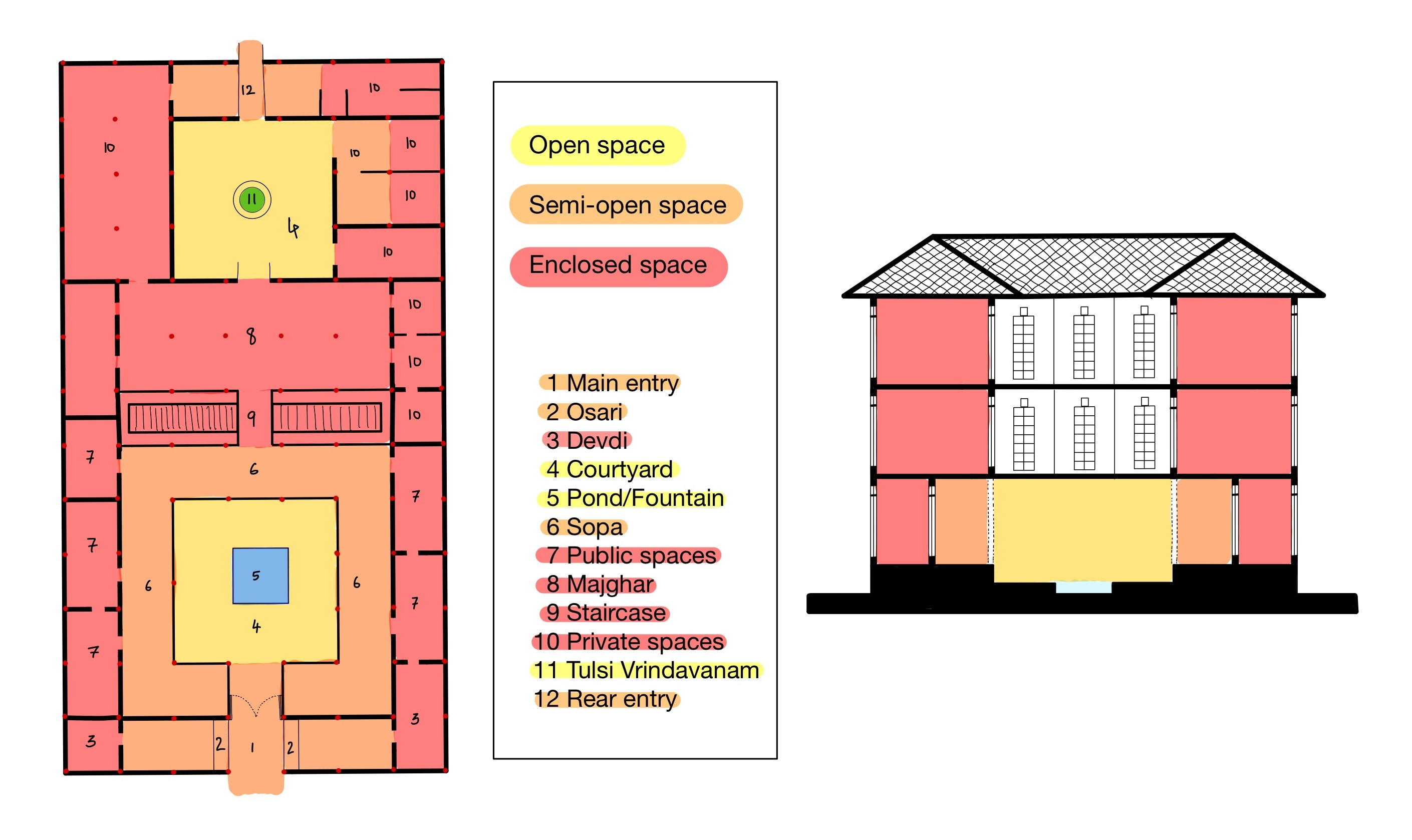
Typical wada plan and section

Since the wada is an introverted house, the courtyard becomes the focus of the house and is the principal organizer of all the spaces and functions oriented towards it. A definite spatial hierarchy is maintained, the thresholds of which may be physical or sensory.

The otlas or osari (platforms) at the plinth level on either side of the entrance staircase were the first stage of interactive public spaces. On either side of the entrance were devdis (small room-like vestibules). On entering the wada, one arrived at the first chowk (courtyard).

The outermost rooms, closer to the entrance were used for storing weapons (shahastraghar) and manuscripts (pothichi kholi), office space (kacheri and daphtar) and other public work (kalbatkhana). The innermost spaces (around the second courtyard if present) were for the women, maternity room (balantinichi kholi), medical room (aushadhi bhandar), kitchen (swaipak ghar), dining (pangaticha sopa), worship (deoghar) and treasury (tijory). Towards the rear entry were gain storage spaces (kothar), cowsheds (goshala) and bathrooms (hound). If present, a third courtyard would be dedicated for a cowshed and water wells. The arrangement of spaces went from public to private.

All these rooms opened into a pillared semi-open area (sopa) around the open courtyards. It forms a connecting space between the rooms and the courtyard. At the center of the court is a sacred potted herb (tulsi vrindavan) in stone or brick, in the inner courtyard, if more than one existed. The outer courtyard would have a fountain or a pond.

The entry ground floor is for public and semi-private daytime activities. The first floor is more private, housing the bedrooms, living spaces, and entertainment halls (diwarkhana) overlooking the courtyard. The uppermost second floor is one large space with no divisions. It is left empty and is not used for any daily activity. It is primarily used as an extra storage space, except during the festivals, it houses the guests.

== Building materials and construction ==
The spacing in the structural grid depended on the length of timber available. The spaces inside were multiples of a unit length of bay called khaan.

Basalt or granite stone is used for plinth. Apart from the abundance of basalt all over the state, it is also rich in granite found in the coastal areas. The eastern parts are rich in limestone.

The walls are thick load-bearing brick masonry or a combination of brick and timer framed structure using saangwan (teak wood) and sandstone and lime mortar for the framework. The bricks were kiln-burnt and made of a combination of clay, sand, cow dung and lime and were called Pushpak Vit (book bricks). These bricks were the size of a book (10 x 6 x 2 inches). Mortar made of varying proportions of lime, sand, jaggery, wheat chaff and water was used to bond the construction. Other locally available wood from Khejri, Peepal and Agar was used. The gum from these trees, cactus juice, of cactus, jaggery, black gram and bananas were used for plastering.

For the upper superstructure, horizontal load distribution ensues through timber beams on the columns or walls, and a secondary timber beam grid is used for bracing. Layered above this is a composite slab with a base tray of timber planks or stone slabs, onto which is filled a dry mixture of sand and husk or brick. The floors are finished in stone slabs. The upper floor, regardless of the lower, remains a timber frame structure with wall panels varying from timber planks, husk boards or a continuation of brick coursing. A filigree timber railing, the most visibly ornamental component in the facade, wraps around the balcony slab and is intercepted with leaner timber posts rising to the roof level.

The roof form is typically pitched with bamboo purlins and rafters on trusses supporting terracotta tiles. Arched alcoves for lighting lamps or for storage were seen on facades and internal walls. The staircases were narrow straight flight wooden stairs within thick mud mortared brick walls connected floors. The roofs varied depending on the location, from sloped roofs in the hot and humid coastal regions to the hot and dry eastern regions.

== Climate responsive architectural features ==
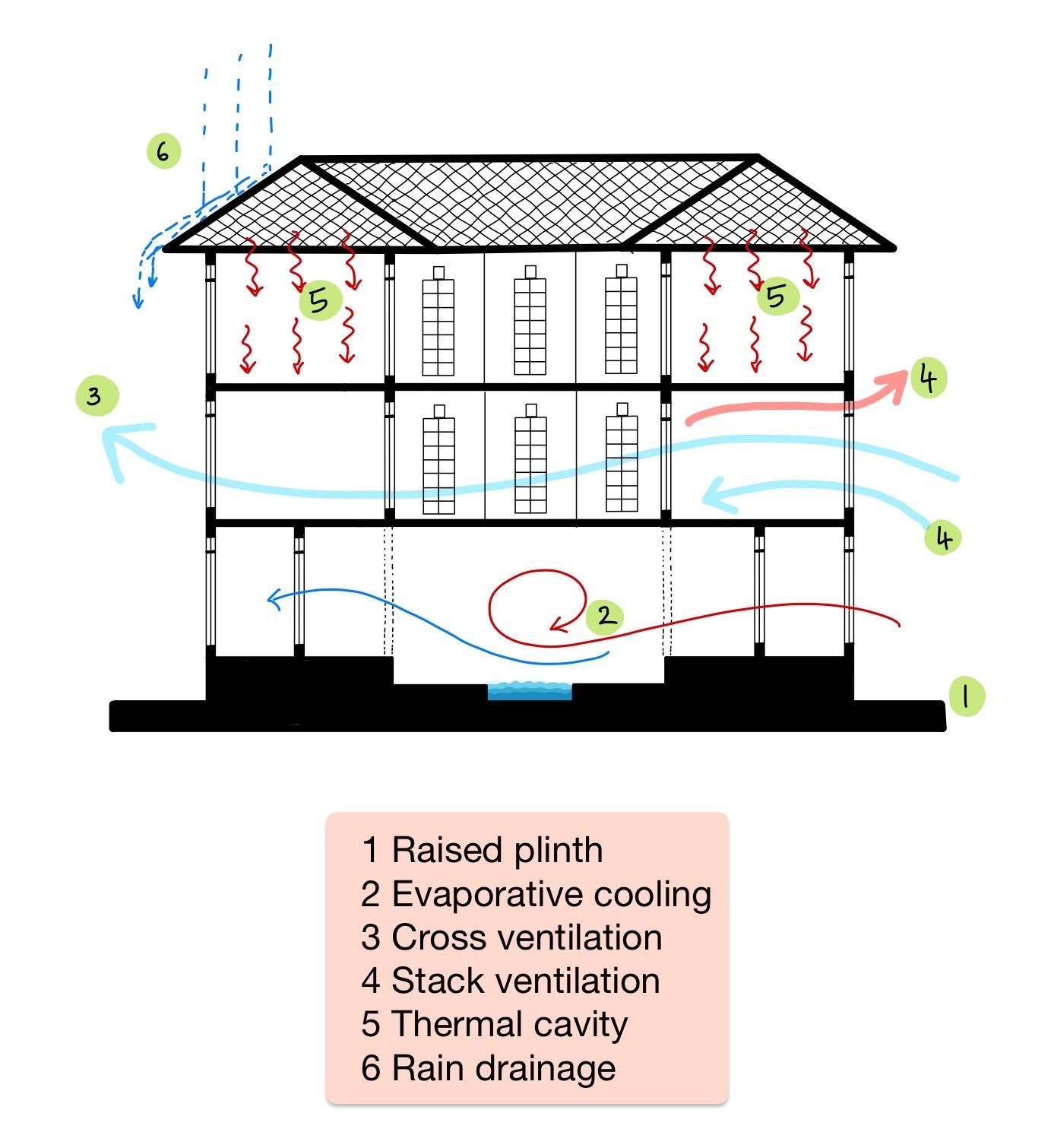
Climate responsive design

Vernacular architecture maximizes utility from limited resources using locally sourced construction materials and passive design strategies. They emerge as a result of geographical, economic and socio-political factors, which combine in various ways not only to provide for shelter, but are also indicative of the owner's image and aspirations. These built forms are climate responsive with inbuilt passive-cooling techniques.

The courtyard in a wada house functions as a convective thermostat, giving protection from extremes of weather and averaging out the diurnal temperature differences. In other words, they serve as micro-climatic moderators and are also the primary source of light and ventilation. They provide indirect diffused light to the spaces around them. Horizontal cross ventilation is through the open court and the doors and windows of the rooms around the courtyard. Vertical circulation is through the narrow staircases. The front courtyard and entry usually face north to minimize direct solar absorption. Courtyards are wide enough to shade during summer and daylight during winter. The fountains and ponds in the first courtyard provide evaporative cooling when the air is drawn over them into the rooms.

The sopa, a semi-open pillared vestibule around the courtyard, is well-lit and ventilated by the court, forming the perfect space for spillover and casual activities of the day. The pangaticha sopa surrounding the inner courtyard also doubles as the dining room.

The majghar, which is the transition space between two courtyards acts as a buffer space between the public and private spaces. It is a dark space and is intentionally left that way, inhibiting any outsider from venturing into private spaces.

The stone plinth is extended to form a dado above which ground floor is raised for protection against floods.

The locally produced high thermal mass of the walls and roof offer longer time lag and prevent the heat build up indoors with thermal reversal and acts as sound and dust insulator. The outer walls are painted a light color to minimize solar absorption. The paint has a distinctive light blue tint since it is made by mixing indigo in lime mortar. Windows are narrow and tall, with a small glass opening at the top. The tall windows provide for circulation even at the foot level.

Overhanging sloped roofs are built, sloping north and south to prevent direct solar radiation and to drain off the rainwater. The pitch covered with terracotta tiles brings in a lot of heat during the daytime. But the uppermost empty floor acts as a thermal cavity between the roof and the living areas downstairs.

== Extinction ==
Vernacular styles go extinct due to the breaking up of joint families, inheritance divisions, lack of appreciation and scarcity of materials and craftsmanship. It also occurs due to fall of the ruling dynasty, that once might have paid patronage to them, in this case the fall of Marathas and Peshwas.

== Sustainability and relevance ==
The construction uses locally available materials not too far from the site; hence, it is time and resource-efficient. The building materials have a relatively low environmental impact and in some cases, are naturally biodegradable or can be reused. The indoor layout designed according to function and prevailing climatic conditions stands the test of time and provides adequate thermal comfort for the occupants. These climate-responsive design features are inherently low maintenance and relevant to achieving energy efficiency even today. Wada houses are generally built on flat grounds, and the main structural challenges are precipitation and floods. Built with a massive envelope and high foundation, most have survived the climatic conditions and are structurally resilient. Towns planning aids communal bonding with ample public spaces for celebration and gathering. This evokes a sense of identity and belonging. Although cast-based (outdoors) and gender-based (indoors) restrictions were prevalent, they must be abandoned.

While vernacular architecture is sustainable by definition and practice, achieving that level of sustainability in today's time with scarce natural resources, dying knowledge and modern lifestyle demands is complex. Fortunately, the wada architecture style is not that ancient, and overall most design and construction features can be adopted with minor adjustments. Wada architecture is gaining popularity in India, primarily as a holiday home, because such an open layout cannot be achieved in a dense urban setting.

== Wadas existing nowadays ==
- Chitnis Wada in Satara
- Chitnis Wada in Nagpur
- Phadnavis Wada in Satara
