= Chhaava =

2025 Indian film by Laxman Utekar

- Theatrical release poster
- Directed by: Laxman Utekar
- Screenplay by: Laxman Utekar; Rishi Virmani; Kaustubh Savarkar; Unman Bankar; Omkar Mahajan
- Dialogues by: Rishi Virmani
- Based on: Chhava by Shivaji Sawant
- Produced by: Dinesh Vijan
- Starring: Vicky Kaushal; Akshaye Khanna; Rashmika Mandanna
- Cinematography: Saurabh Goswami
- Edited by: Manish Pradhan
- Music by: A. R. Rahman
- Production company: Maddock Films
- Distributed by: Pen Marudhar (India); Yash Raj Films (International)
- Release date: 14 February 2025
- Running time: 161 minutes
- Country: India
- Language: Hindi
- Budget: ₹90–130 crore (Note: Chhaava's reported budget vary between ₹90 crore (DNA India and Hindustan Times) – ₹130 crore (India Herald, and The Hans India))
- Box office: ₹797.34–809 crore (Note: Chhaava's reported worldwide grosses vary between ₹797.34 crore (Bollywood Hungama) – ₹800 crore (India Today) – ₹804.85 crore (The Economic Times) – ₹807.40 crore (DNA India) – ₹809 crore (Hindustan Times))

Chhaava (transl. Lion cub) is a 2025 Indian Hindi-language epic historical action film based on the life of Sambhaji, the second ruler of the Maratha Empire, who is played by Vicky Kaushal. An adaptation of the Marathi novel Chhava by Shivaji Sawant, it is directed by Laxman Utekar and produced by Dinesh Vijan under Maddock Films. The cast also includes Akshaye Khanna and Rashmika Mandanna.

Pre-production began in April 2023; filming commenced in October 2023 and ended in May 2024. The film score and soundtrack album were composed by A. R. Rahman while the lyrics were written by Irshad Kamil and Kshitij Patwardhan.

Chaava was released in theatres on 14 February 2025 in standard and IMAX formats. The film received mixed reviews from critics and sparked controversy due to its historical inaccuracies and religious issues. Commercially, it has earned ₹797.34 crore (US$83 million)–₹809 crore (US$84 million) to rank the third-highest-grossing Indian film of 2025, and the second highest-grossing Hindi film of 2025. When the film was taken off the screens, it was the eighth highest-grossing Hindi film in Indian film history.

== Plot ==
A messenger informs Mughal Emperor Aurangzeb of the death of Shivaji. Although Aurangzeb acknowledges the loss of a formidable enemy, he announces a celebration. His courtiers are confident that the Maratha Confederacy will soon collapse. However, Shivaji's son and successor, Sambhaji, quickly takes charge of continuing the resistance. He launches a sudden attack on Burhanpur, a key Mughal province. The city's defenders are caught off guard by the Maratha army and are defeated in the assault. During the battle, Sambhaji steps on a trapdoor and falls into a chamber housing a lion. He bravely faces the animal and splits its jaw apart with his bare hands. Aurangzeb learns of the attack and realises that the Maratha resistance endures. He commences a huge military crusade to protect his authority.

Meanwhile, Sambhaji is welcomed home by his wife Yesubai, where he is formally crowned as the Chhatrapati. However, his stepmother, Soyarabai, and a few courtiers including Annaji Datto Sachiv, conspire to overthrow Sambhaji and install Soyarabai's son, Rajaram, on the throne. Elsewhere, Aurangzeb's army raids villages, committing mass murders, arson, and rapes while simultaneously taking several inhabitants as slaves and subjecting them to torture. Mirza Muhammad Akbar, Aurangzeb's estranged son, seeks assistance from Sambhaji to rebel against his father. When Sambhaji hesitates, Akbar exposes his own discreet communication with Soyarabai and her intention to subvert the king; a devastated Sambhaji promises to protect Akbar and executes the treacherous courtiers while Soyarabai is confronted by Hambirrao Mohite, her own brother and Sambhaji's loyal general.

Sambhaji implements guerrilla tactics to subdue Aurangzeb's forces, who incur heavy losses due to the attacks and the Deccan's challenging topography. Soyarabai soon dies of illness and Sambhaji takes the responsibility of Rajaram and arranges his wedding with Hambirrao's daughter, Tarabai. Hambirrao later dies in one of the battles. Meanwhile, Aurangzeb feels insulted by the persistent defeats and vows to remain uncrowned until Sambhaji is crushed. Zinat-un-Nissa, his daughter, plans to imprison her brother, Mirza Akbar, but Sambhaji foils her plans, sticking to his oath. Upon discovering that several Jagirdars are apostatising, Sambhaji convenes a conference in Sangameshwar and inspires them to fight and sustain the Confederacy. However, Yesubai's resentful brothers deceive Sambhaji and help the Mughals in locating him on a night while he is with a small army of 150.

The Mughal army implements its ambush and the Maratha soldiers are heavily outnumbered; Maratha generals Santaji Ghorpade and Dhanaji Jadhav survive the onslaught and are instructed to leave and apprise Yesubai of the ambuscade. Sambhaji valiantly fights and kills many Mughal soldiers until he is captured alongside his friend and advisor, Kavi Kalash. Sambhaji and Kavi Kalash are carried off to the camps of Aurangzeb, who offers Sambhaji a chance to surrender and join hands with them, but he refuses to renounce his ideals and declares that the Marathas will continue to fight for "Swaraj". Kavi Kalash is subsequently executed and Sambhaji is subjected to a 40 days brutal torture: salt is rubbed on his wounds; his fingernails are pulled out; hot iron rods are pierced into his eyes, and his tongue is torn out. Nevertheless, he remains defiant and eventually succumbs to his injuries; Aurangzeb is left dissatisfied and grieves over not having a son like him.

Elsewhere, Yesubai endorses the Maratha resistance on behalf of her husband and crowns Rajaram as the next Chhatrapati. A textual epilogue reveals that the Maratha Empire eventually triumphed with the Mughal Empire collapsing within three decades of Sambhaji's execution by Aurangzeb.

== Cast ==
Adapted from the closing credits:

- Vicky Kaushal as Chhatrapati Sambhaji Maharaj
- Akshaye Khanna as Mughal Emperor Aurangzeb
- Rashmika Mandanna as Yesubai Bhonsale
- Ashutosh Rana as Hambirrao Mohite
- Divya Dutta as Soyarabai
- Vineet Kumar Singh as Kavi Kalash
- Neil Bhoopalam as Prince Muhammad Akbar
- Diana Penty as Zinat-un-Nissa Begum
- Pradeep Rawat as Yesaji Kank
- Santosh Juvekar as Rayaji Malge
- Kiran Karmarkar as Annaji Datto Sachiv
- Vijay Vikram Singh as Peshwa Neelopant
- Balaji Manohar as Mhaloji
- Neelkante Patekar as Dharau
- Anil George as Muqarrab Khan
- Sarang Sathaye as Ganoji Shirke
- Suvrat Joshi as Kanhoji Shirke
- Ankit Anil Sharma as Santaji Ghorpade
- Ashish Pathode as Antaji Mankeshwar Gandhe
- Shubhankar Ekbote as Dhanaji Jadhav
- Siraj Mustafa as Bahadur Khan
- Shivraj Walvekar as Bahirji Naik
- Alok Nath as Somaji
- Manoj Kolhatkar as Balaji Avaji Chitnis
- Danish Pandor as Ikhlas Khan
- Rohit Pathak as Kakkad Khan
- Sukhwinder Singh Grewal as Khan Zamaan
- Lavi Pajni as Shaubuddin Firozjang
- Trishan Singh as Muhammad Azam Shah
- Ruffy Khan as Shehzaada Muazzam
- Rakesh Theraja as Sarja Khan
- Akshay Anand Kohli as Rahulla Khan
- Astad Kale as Surya
- Sanjeev Jaiswal as Jhaalad
- Varun Buddhadev as Chhatrapati Rajaram Maharaj
- Sanchita Ugale as Tarabai
- Ajay Devgn as the narrator in the opening sequence (voiceover)

== Production ==
=== Development ===
Everyone knows about Chhatrapati Shivaji Maharaj, but no one knows about Chatrapati Sambhaji Maharaj. He had such great courage and was a great warrior, but sadly no one knows about it. During the pandemic when I read about Sambhaji Maharaj, I realised he is such a big character, and why are we not talking about his life? That's when I started writing and the idea of Chhaava came to me.

— Laxman Utekar, during an interview with India Today

In December 2022, it was reported that Laxman Utekar was working on a historical biopic in an untitled film in which Vicky Kaushal's casting was under progress. They discussed the project and Kaushal has liked the material and would sign the project only after the full narration. As it was still in the writing process, the shooting would commence after Kaushal finalise it. It was based on the Marathi novel Chhava by Shivaji Sawant. In January 2023, the project was confirmed which would mark Kaushal teams up with Utekar and producer Dinesh Vijan once again after their then-unreleased romantic comedy film co-starring Sara Ali Khan. The film was titled Chhava and Kaushal would play Chhatrapati Sambhaji Maharaj, the eldest son of the Maratha empire's founder Chhatrapati Shivaji Maharaj. Rashmika Mandanna was cast to play role of Sambhaji Maharaj's wife, as Yesubai Bhonsale. Maddock Films known for modest budget films, Chhava will be their most expensive project. Laxman Utekar said that even before he began writing the script in 2021 he wanted to cast Kaushal and Mandanna for the respective roles.

=== Pre-production ===
Utekar and his team spent a year researching the 17th-century Maratha era, travelling to historical towns like Chhatrapati Sambhaji Nagar, Ratnagiri, Pune, Nashik, and Paithan. Sheetal Sharma served as costume designer, sourcing authentic Paithani sarees and restored 500-year-old borders for Mandanna's character, Yesubai. To ensure authenticity, he visited Paithan and Narayanpeth to acquire Paithani and Narayanpeth sarees. Additional accessories were gathered from Kolhapur, Sawantwadi, and Ratnagiri. Sharma also mentioned that Vicky Kaushal's outfit in the first action sequence of the film weighed approximately 17–18 kg. Subrata Chakraborty and Amit Ray recreated jewellery and the sword Bhavani, drawing references from museums in London. Kaushal's portrayal of Sambhaji was based on historical busts and statues to ensure accuracy. A. R. Rahman was roped in to compose the score.

The film was officially announced on 3 October 2023, when Maddock Films revealed its upcoming slate of theatrical releases, including the release date for Chhaava.

=== Casting and filming ===
Laxman Utekar discussed his upcoming film with Vicky Kaushal during the shoot of Zara Hatke Zara Bachke (2023). In January 2023, Utekar confirmed that Kaushal would portray Sambhaji, marking their second collaboration following Zara Hatke Zara Bachke. Kaushal would be reportedly receiving a ₹10 crore (US$1.0 million) remuneration. Utekar mentioned that Kaushal would undergo four months of training in sword fighting, horse riding, and that shooting would begin once they were satisfied with his preparation. Vaibhav Vishant served as casting director. In August 2023, it was reported that Marathi actor Santosh Juvekar would play a pivotal role in the film. He was originally cast as Ganoji Shirke, but later, director Laxman Utekar met with him in his office and offered him the role of Rayaji Malge instead. During the same month, Juvekar and Kaushal underwent horse riding training in the Mumbai suburbs. During trailer launch, Kaushal revealed that he was trained in sword, stick, and spear fighting for 6–7 months. He also gained 25 kg weight for the role. During shooting in Raigad a set was constructed for the scene depicting Chhatrapati Sambhaji's ascension to the throne, featuring an eight-sided throne.

By October 2023, it was reported that Kaushal had started his preparations for the film alongside co-star Rashmika Mandanna. The film's main shooting will begin in Mumbai in October 2023, with the first round of shooting scheduled for one week. Mandanna would be reportedly receiving ₹4 crore (US$420,000) remuneration. The same month, Ashutosh Rana and Divya Dutta join cast as Hambirrao Mohite and Soyarabai, respectively. Rana would be reportedly receiving ₹80 lakh (US$83,000) remuneration. Dutta later discussed her portrayal in an interview with Mid-Day in December 2024. She said that she and Kaushal often communicated in Punjabi on set. On 4 December 2023, Pradeep Rawat joined the film's cast.

According to reports, Kaushal was seriously injured while filming a war scene. He was sidelined for nearly 20 days as a result. Mandanna wrapped up her portion of filming in January 2024, while Kaushal resumed filming in Wai on 9 March 2024, continuing until 6 April 2024. On 23 April 2024, Santosh Juvekar completed his portions. Earlier in the production process, the team had approached Anil Kapoor for the role of Aurangzeb, but in October 2023, Akshaye Khanna joined the cast in the role instead. He would be reportedly receiving ₹2 crore (US$210,000) for his remuneration. Diana Penty joined the film in the role of Zinat-un-Nissa Begum. Principal photography for the film wrapped in May 2024. Initially, Utekar had approached Marathi actor Ashok Shinde for a negative role, but Shinde declined the offer due to a scheduling conflict with his existing contract with Zee, as he revealed in a November 2024 interview with ItsMajja.

=== Post-production ===
After filming concluded in May 2024, the movie entered post-production. On 11 February 2025, Pinkvilla reported that Ajay Devgn was hired to provide a voiceover for the film, completing his dubbing in the final week.

On 1 February 2025, the film was granted a U/A 16+ certification by the Central Board of Film Certification (CBFC), with a runtime of 161 minutes and 50 seconds. The CBFC required certain modifications, including the replacement of dialogues in the first half and the removal of a scene featuring Maratha warriors in sarees. Additionally, the CBFC requested the inclusion of an audio-text disclaimer, mentioning the book the film is adapted from and clarifying that it does not aim to defame anyone or distort historical facts. Following backlash from certain Maharashtrian political figures for featuring a scene in the trailer in which Chatrapati Sambhaji and his wife perform lezim dance, Utekar decided to delete the sequence from the film.

=== Visual effects ===
The visual effects were handled by Assemblage Entertainment and ReDefine. Gary Brown and Simon Frame from Assemblage and Somesh Samit Ghosh from ReDefine served as the VFX supervisors for the film.

== Music ==
The music of the film is composed by A. R. Rahman while the lyrics are written by Irshad Kamil and Kshitij Patwardhan. The first single titled "Jaane Tu" was released on 31 January 2025. The second single titled "Aaya Re Toofan" was released on 6 February 2025. The album launch event was held on 13 February 2025.

== Marketing ==
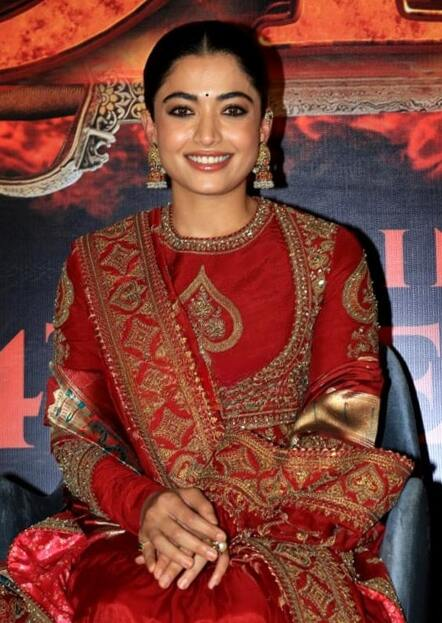
Rashmika Mandana at the trailer launch in Mumbai

The teaser of the film was showcased before the preview shows of Stree 2, and was later released on social media on 19 August 2024, coinciding Raksha Bandhan. The official trailer of the film launched on 22 January 2025 in Mumbai. As part of the promotional campaign, Vicky Kaushal, Laxman Utekar, and Rashmika Mandanna held a fan meet at the 24th Kala Ghoda Arts Festival on 3 February 2025 in Mumbai. On 13 February 2025, Chhaava's album launch event took place in Mumbai, where Rashmika Mandanna showcased a regal look in a floral Indo-Western suit designed by Anita Dongre for the event. Following popular demand, the film was also scheduled for release in a Telugu-dubbed version, with its Telugu trailer unveiled on 3 May 2025.

London's Palace of Westminster lights up to the tune of "Aaya Re Toofan", composed by A.R. Rahman. Promotional activities were also held across various cities in the country, including Chatrapati Sambhajinagar, Mumbai, Jaipur, Kolkata, Patna, Amritsar, Shirdi, Hyderabad, and Delhi.

== Release ==
=== Theatrical ===
Initially set to release on 6 December 2024, the film was later postponed to 14 February 2025. The film was simultaneously released in Russia. The film has been declared tax-free in Madhya Pradesh and Goa. The Telugu language dubbed version of the film was released on 7 March 2025.

=== Distribution ===
The film was distributed by Pen Marudhar in India and Yash Raj Films internationally. The Telugu version was distributed by Geetha Arts in Andhra Pradesh and Telangana.

=== Home media ===
The film's digital streaming rights were acquired by Netflix. It began streaming on the platform from 11 April 2025.

== Reception ==
=== Box office ===
As of 20 April 2025, Chhaava has grossed ₹708.5 crore (US$74 million) domestically and ₹88.84 crore (US$9.2 million) overseas for a worldwide gross of ₹797.34 crore (US$83 million).

Chhaava had a strong opening day, particularly in the state of Maharashtra, earning ₹33.10 crore (US$3.4 million) in India. The film collected ₹157 crore (US$16 million)–₹164 crore (US$17 million) worldwide in its opening weekend, making it Laxman Utekar's highest-grossing film, surpassing his previous film Luka Chuppi, which earned ₹128.6 crore (US$13 million). It grossed US$2.2 million in its opening weekend in the US. On 19 February 2025, the film earned ₹33 crore (US$3.4 million) and become the ninth fastest Hindi film to reach ₹200 crore club and also setting a record for the highest collection on a first Wednesday. In its first week, the film earned ₹225 crore (US$23 million) in India and ₹310.50 crore (US$32 million) globally. By the second Saturday, it earned ₹44.10 crore (US$4.6 million). The film entered the ₹300 crore club in domestic market in its second weekend and crossed ₹400 crore (US$42 million) globally.

In its second week, the film collected ₹180.25 crore (US$19 million). On 1 March 2025, the film entered in ₹400 crore club in domestic market. The film earned ₹84.05 crore (US$8.7 million) in the third week and ₹55.95 crore (US$5.8 million) in the fourth week. Pinkvilla reported that the film grossed over ₹678 crore (US$70 million) worldwide while accumulated ₹95 crore (US$9.9 million) from international markets in 24 days. The film entered the ₹500 crore club in India in its fourth week and achieved ₹700 crore (US$73 million) worldwide in 25 days. The Telugu version opened with ₹2.5 crore (US$260,000). On March 11, 2025, the film's collection reached ₹516.8 crore (US$54 million), making it the sixth highest-grossing Hindi film, surpassing the Hindi total of ₹510.99 crore (US$53 million) achieved by Baahubali 2: The Conclusion. In the first week, the Telugu version grossed ₹11.8 crore (US$1.2 million), and by the second weekend, it earned ₹2.15 crore (US$220,000). By the second Monday, the total collection had reached ₹14.25 crore (US$1.5 million).

In its fifth week of release, Chhaava earned ₹30.60 crore (US$3.2 million) net, taking its total net collection to ₹530 crore (US$55 million) by the end of the week. On 36th day, the film collected ₹535 crore (US$56 million) net and grossed over ₹773.25 crore (US$80 million) worldwide. The following day, it exceeded ₹775.75 crore (US$81 million). Bollywood Hungama reported that the film grossed over ₹583.25 crore (US$61 million) in India and ₹785.50 crore (US$82 million) worldwide in 38 days. On 40th day of release, the film's earnings reached ₹787.5 crore (US$82 million). On the 41st day, the film earned over ₹698.65 crore (US$73 million) in India and ₹91 crore (US$9.4 million) internationally, bringing its total worldwide gross to ₹789.65 crore (US$82 million).

In the sixth week, the film earned ₹14.4 crore (US$1.5 million)–₹15.60 crore (US$1.6 million) net in India and become the second highest sixth week grosser Hindi film of all time. The Telugu version earned ₹15.86 crore (US$1.6 million) in three weeks. The film's net collection in its seventh week stands at ₹6.55 crore (US$680,000)–₹7 crore (US$730,000), including ₹2 lakh (US$2,100) from Telugu version, making it the second-highest after Stree 2 which collected ₹8.75 crore (US$910,000). According to The Financial Express, the worldwide gross collection of Chhaava has reached ₹800 crore (US$83 million), with a domestic net of ₹595 crore (US$62 million). Jagran further reported that the film surpassed ₹600 crore (US$62 million) net in domestic markets in same period. The domestic net surpassed ₹596 crore (US$62 million)–₹600 crore (US$62 million) in 50 days. (Note: The Times of India and Moneycontrol reported the domestic net collection on 50th day around ₹596.20 crore, while Deccan Chronicle reports ₹600 crore.) As per DNA India, Chhaava has earned ₹601.1 crore (US$62 million) net in India, including ₹585.23 crore (US$61 million) from the original Hindi version and ₹15.87 crore (US$1.6 million) from the dubbed Telugu version. The film's total global gross stands at ₹807.88 crore (US$84 million). The film earned US$6.4 million in North America. Bollywood Hungama, India Herald, The Times of India, and Moneycontrol all reported that the film crossed ₹600 crore (US$62 million) net in India on its 66th day of release, becoming the first non-sequel Hindi film to do so in the Hindi language only. (Note: Multiple references) Previously, only Jawan, Stree 2, and Pushpa 2: The Rule had crossed the ₹600 crore net mark in India. However, Jawan—while also a non-sequel—achieved this figure through collections from multiple language versions (Hindi, Tamil, Telugu).

The film grossed over ₹797.34 crore (US$83 million)–₹809 crore (US$84 million) globally including ₹600 crore (US$62 million)–₹611 crore (US$63 million) net in India and ₹103 crore (US$11 million) in international markets in its final theatrical run. (Note: Multiple references)

Chhaava become the highest-grossing film in Maharashtra grossed over ₹300 crore, surpassing Pushpa 2: The Rule, which earned ₹250 crore (US$26 million). As of 18 March 2025, the film garnered 2.75 crore (27.5 million) footfalls.

=== Critical response ===
On the review aggregator website Rotten Tomatoes, 29% of 14 critics' reviews are positive, with an average rating of 5/10.

Prasanna Zore of Rediff rated the film 4 out of 5, writing "Chhaava deserves 2 stars for the historically half-baked film that it is, but 4 stars just for its attempt on making a film on Chhatrapati Sambhaji Maharaj." Zee News gave 4 stars out of 5 stars and wrote "Chhaava is much more than just an action-packed period drama; it's a film that resonates with its historical significance while maintaining its emotional core." Pooja Biraia of The Week rated 3.5 stars out of 5 stars and wrote "The film showcases regality and grandeur, adrenaline-pumping action sequences and punchy dialogues, but interestingly, it does all of that and more, while ensuring it doesn't lose track of the plot and the narrative that runs beautifully across all its frames."

Nishad Thaivalappil of News18 rated the film 3.5 out of 5 and the reviewer highlights Vicky Kaushal's outstanding portrayal of Chhatrapati Sambhaji Maharaj and praises the film for effectively capturing his legacy. Kusumika Das of Times Now awarded 3.5 stars out of 5 stars and wrote "While Utekar’s storytelling could have been tighter, his attempt is commendable. Most notably, Chhaava unveils a fierce, unrelenting Vicky Kaushal in a historical saga." Renuka Vyavahare of The Times of India have 3.5 stars out of 5 stars and wrote "Chhaava’s excellence lies in its gripping second half and a terrific climax." Devesh Sharma of Filmfare rated 3.5 stars out of 5 stars and noted that Chhaava succeeds in delivering a high-intensity action film, anchored by Vicky Kaushal's powerhouse performance. However, he pointed out that the film doesn't fully delve into the complexities of Sambhaji's character, leaving much of his multifaceted legacy unexplored.

Baradwaj Rangan wrote for Galatta Plus, "Chhaava is not exactly a misfire, but it doesn’t rise above being watchable...There are attempts to get into the psyche of Sambhaji with surrealistic nightmares that show the king as a lost little boy with philosophical questions. We get quiet, intimate scenes that show Sambhaji yearning for his mother who died when he was very young. But this sort of delicacy doesn’t fit in with the ethos of a “mass” movie that wants to show Sambhaji as a superhero. “Mass” movies usually work best when they aim low and deliver highs..Chhaava, to its credit, aims high. But it doesn't come together satisfactorily. What we end up with is a violent showcase for two fine actors." Shubhra Gupta of The Indian Express, gave 2.5 out of 5 rating and wrote "Vicky Kaushal is fully committed in Laxman Utekar’s ultra-loud, ultra-violent, and exhausting film." Saibal Chatterjee of NDTV gave 2.5 stars out of 5 and said that "The film, has far greater depth than the top-heavy treatment that it deploys India order to pay tribute to Chhatrapati Sambhaji Maharaj." Pratikshya Mishra of The Quint gave it 2.5 stars and commented that "Unlike its protagonist, who often runs into battle like a man possessed even when the odds seem stacked against him, the film simply wasn’t brave enough to take that leap." Tushar Joshi of India Today wrote, "Chhaava doesn't aim to be exceptionally different, but it masters the art of navigating the mainstream waters without completely drowning in the cacophony of its own voice." He rated the film 3 out of 5.

Rahul Desai of The Hollywood Reporter India observed that "Chhaava is neither romanticised nor pulpy. It’s just scared. So scared that only gods and demons can afford to exist. So scared that it’s blinded by its own reflection." Anuj Kumar of The Hindu said that "Struggling to choose between history and the current nationalist sentiment, Laxman Utekar’s unsurprising narrative finds its voice in the final." Nandini Ramnath of Scroll.in said in her review that "Laxman Utekar takes us through every bit of this ordeal – it’s what Chhaava has been building up to. The Christ-like imagery is apposite, given the all-round love for medieval punishment. But the film’s lack of feeling is vivid too, with shouty speechifying mistaken for heartfelt passion and sumptuous visuals confused for grandeur."

== Accolades ==
Award	Ceremony date	Category	Recipients	Result	Ref.
Zee Cine Awards	1 March 2026	Best Film	Chhaava	Won	
Zee Cine Awards	1 March 2026	Best Actor – Male	Vicky Kaushal	Won	
Zee Cine Awards	1 March 2026	Best Actor in a Supporting Role – Male	Vineet Kumar Singh	Won	
Screen Awards	5 April 2026	Best Film	Chhaava	Nominated	
Screen Awards	5 April 2026	Best Actor	Vicky Kaushal	Nominated	
Screen Awards	5 April 2026	Best Director	Vineet Kumar Singh	Nominated	
Screen Awards	5 April 2026	Best Supporting Actress	Divya Dutta	Nominated	
Screen Awards	5 April 2026	Best Action	Chhaava	Nominated	
Screen Awards	5 April 2026	Best Background Score	A. R. Rahman	Nominated	
Screen Awards	5 April 2026	Best Costume	Sheetal Sharma (Note: Shared with Smriti Chauhan (Dhurandhar))	Won	
Screen Awards	5 April 2026	Best Hairstyling & Make-Up	Shrikant Desai	Nominated	
Screen Awards	5 April 2026	Best Production Design	Subrata Chakraborty, Amit Ray	Nominated	
Screen Awards	5 April 2026	Best Sound Design	Bishwadeep Chatterjee	Nominated	
Screen Awards	5 April 2026	Best Special Effects	Chhaava	Nominated	
Indian National Cine Academy Awards	15–16 April 2026	Best Costume	Sheetal Sharma	Won	
Indian National Cine Academy Awards	15–16 April 2026	Best Film - Hindi	Dinesh Vijan & Maddock Films	Won	

== Controversies ==
=== Historical inaccuracies ===
Dinesh Vijan was threatened with a ₹100 crore (approximately US$12 million) lawsuit for allegedly depicting historical inaccuracies and misrepresentation. The Shirke family, claiming to represent the descendants of historical figures portrayed in the film, raised objections, alleging that their ancestors were wrongly depicted as traitors. Director Laxman Utekar responded to the controversy by apologising for any unintentional distress caused and clarified that the film does not explicitly name the families or villages of the concerned historical figures. A historian, Indrajit Sawant, claimed that he faced threats and caste-based abuse for challenging the film's historical accuracy, alleging that it distorts history by wrongly portraying Soyarabai Bhosale as one of the antagonists instead of Annaji Datto, the Sachiv for Shivaji Maharaj. Sawant cited contemporary accounts suggesting Brahmin clerks betrayed Sambhaji to the Mughals, leading to his capture.

=== Religious hostility ===
Citing several tweets, The Siasat Daily alleges Chhaava reignited the wave of hate and hostility against Muslims across India, calling it one of the few movies to do so after The Kashmir Files and The Kerala Story. Several politicians like Abu Azmi and Asaduddin Owaisi criticized the movie and praised Emperor Aurangzeb, which led to backlash among right-wing Hindu organizations and Bharatiya Janata Party leaders. Right wing groups like Vishva Hindu Parishad and Bajrang Dal condemned the glorification and threatened to demolish the tomb of Aurangzeb, located in Aurangabad, as they claimed it as a reminder of “centuries of oppression, atrocities, and slavery” of Hindus during his rule. The incident subsequently led to riots across Nagpur on 17 March 2025 and several law enforcement officers were injured in the clash, with Chief Minister Devendra Fadnavis urging for calm and condemning any glorification of Aurangzeb. He blamed the movie for the Nagpur violence.
