= Pingale =

Pingale is a surname. Notable people with the surname include:

- Bahiroji Pingale, Peshwa of Maratha Empire 1708–1711
- Devidas Anandrao Pingale (born 1961), Indian politician
- Manoj Pingale (born 1967), Indian boxer
- Moreshvar Pingale (died 1689), Peshwa of Maratha Empire 1683–1689
