= Charholi Budruk =

- Urban
- Location in India
- Coordinates: 18.655866°N 73.893685°E
- Country: India
- State: Maharashtra

Government
  - Type: Municipal Corporation
  - Body: PCMC, Pune

Population
  - Total: 39,600

Languages
  - Official: Marathi
- Time zone: UTC+5:30 (IST)
- PIN: 411081
- Vehicle registration: MH 14, MH 12

Charholi Budruk is a suburban community on the outskirts of the city of Pune, India. It lies on the southern bank of the Indrayani River. Since 1997, it has been part of the Pimpri-Chinchwad Municipal Corporation.

In 2024, the foundation was laid for a new IT park spanning 3,000,000 square feet (280,000 m^{2}). In 2025, the Charholi Budruk Post Office was upgraded from rural pin code 412105 to an urban pin code 411981 due to steady growth in the area.

During the late Maratha period, one of the ruling officers of the village was Tapkir, whose wada ruins can still be found. The community has two Shiv temples and a temple of Kālabhairav.

Local residents here are Bhosale, Tapkir, Kotwal, Pathare, Burde, Raskar, Dabhade, Kalje, Tamhane, Bhujbal, Ghare, Kate
