= Sachiv =

Chief secretary in the Maratha Empire

Sachiv of Maratha Empire
- Residence: Bhor Rajwada
- Appointer: Chhatrapati; Hereditary (1697–1818)
- First holder: Annaji Datto Sachiv
- Succession: None

The Sachiv (the Chief Secretary) was an important member of the ministry in the Maratha Empire. Sachiv was one of the Ashta Pradhans of Maratha Empire during the rule of Chhatrapathi Shivaji. Later during the reign of Rajaram I, the office became hereditary like most of the others instituted by Shivaji. Shankaraji Narayan Pant Sachiv, who was appointed to the post in 1698 by Rajaram I was a hereditary Pant Sachiv. The Pant Amatya and The Pant Sachiv were the most powerful civil functionaries in the Maratha Empire next to the Peshwa until the death of Shahu I.

== Bibliography ==
- Copland, Ian (1982). The British Raj and the Indian princes: paramountcy in western India, 1857-1930. Sangam Books. ISBN 9780861312450.
