= Annaji Datto Sachiv =

Indian Historical Figure from 1700s

Annaji Datto Sachiv Surnavis and Sachiv

Maratha Empire
- Monarchs: Shivaji; Sambhaji

Personal details
- Spouse: Lakshmibai
- Relations: Somaji Datto (Brother)
- Children: Ragho Annaji; Godavari

Annaji Datto Sachiv was the Sachiv (Chief Secretary) in the Ashta Pradhan (Council of 8) mandal of the Maratha Empire during the rule of Shivaji.

He was portrayed by Kiran Karmarkar in the 2025 Hindi film Chhaava.

== Early life ==
Before joining the services of Shivaji, Annaji Datto was a Kulkarni of Sangameshwar. He joined Shivaji's administration in 1647.

== Career ==
=== Campaign on Panhala and Pawangad ===
Annaji Datto was assigned the job of capturing the Panhala fort after the Afzal episode. In 1659, Annaji captured the Panhala fort and Pawangad fort from the Mughals.

=== Minister under Shivaji ===
==== Tax Assessment Based On The Corps ====
In 1667, Chhatrapati Shivaji Maharaj appointed Annaji to the task of land revenue reform in areas under the Swarajya.He improved upon Malik Amber's revenue system and introduced a new one. Annaji's efforts led to a new system of lower government claim on farm produce of 2/5.His work involved accurate land measurement, bringing new land under cultivation, and measures to reduce exploitation of the illiterate cultivators by the hereditary village officials such as the Patil and Kulkarni. Annaji Datto also carried out a survey known as Annaji Datto's Dhara. He improved upon Malik Amber's revenue system and introduced a new one, which is considered to be one of the great land-marks in the deve- lopment of agriculture in Maharashtra in medieval time

==== Sarkarkun for Konkan division ====
According to Subhasad Bhakhar, the Maratha Empire of Shivaji was divided into three parts, each under a cabinet minister, called a Sarkarkun. Annaji Datto Sachiv, Moropant Trimbak Pingle, and Dattoji Pant were appointed sarkarkun. As sarkarkun, Annaji Datto controlled the Konkan territory, including Choul. Dabhol, Rajapur, Kudal, Bande, Phonda, and Koppal. This division between territories was called Talghat or Southern division.

=== Conflict with Sambhaji ===
Shivaji's eldest son and presumptive heir, Sambhaji, was sent to the fort of Panhala by his father, due to the conflict between him and ashtpradhan mandal. However, in December 1678 Sambhaji left the fort and defected to the Mughals for a year under a secret plan of shivaji maharaj and sambhaji raje, but then returned home when he learnt of a plan by Dilir Khan, the Mughal viceroy of Deccan to arrest him and send him to Delhi. Upon returning home, Sambhaji was again put under surveillance at Panhala by his father due to asthpradhan mandal influenced by anaji datto However, Shivaji soon fell ill and died in April 1680. The news of Shivaji's death reached Sambhaji at Panhala within eleven days.

==== Conspiracy of Soyarabai ====
At the time of Shivaji's death, Soyarabai, Shivaji's widow, conspired with Annaji to lure the Council of ministers (Ashtapradhan Mandal), into electing her then ten-year old younger son Rajaram to the throne of the Maratha Empire with Soyarabai as the Queen regent. On 21 April 1680, arrangements were made to make Rajaram's position secure. The coronation of Rajaram I was performed by Annaji and a few of Rajaram's supporters.

Soyarabai and the Ministers proposed to Sambhaji the division of the Maratha Empire. When their proposal of the division of the Swarajya was turned down by Sambhaji, Annaji and others marched against Sambhaji. However, Sambhaji quickly won over the support of the Maratha army. He arrested those who had marched against him on the way to Panhala, between 19 May and 2 June 1680. Sambhaji marched on Raigad and gained possession of the capital on 18 June 1680. He promptly put Soyarabai in close confinement.

=== Execution ===
Annaji and other ministers involved in the conspiracy were arrested and either executed or confined. Annaji was however released after a period. Later in 1681 when Prince Akbar, Aurangzeb's rebel son was given asylum by Sambhaji, Annaji and several members of the Shirke clan (of Yesubai) promised the Deccan to Akbar in exchange for leaving a small kingdom for Rajaram. Akbar refused to be a party to this conspiracy and betrayed these conspirators to Sambhaji who quickly executed Annaji, his brother Somaji, a large number of the Ashtapradhan Council and members of the Shirke family in August 1681.

== Popular culture ==
=== Films and television ===
- In the 2018 Indian Marathi-language historical film Farzand, he is portrayed by Rahul Mehendale.
- In the 2017-2020 Indian historical serial Swarajyarakshak Sambhaji, he is portrayed by Mahesh Kokate.

== Bibliography ==
- Apte, Bhalchandra Krishna (1974). Chhatrapati Shivaji: coronation tercentenary commemoration volume. University of Bombay.
- Vaidya, Sushila (2000). Role of women in Maratha politics, 1620-1752 A.D. Sharada Publication House. ISBN 9788185616674.
- Singh, U. B. (1998). Administrative System in India: Vedic Age to 1947. APH Publishing. ISBN 9788170249283.
- Deopujari, Murlidhar Balkrishna (1973). Shivaji and the Maratha Art of War. Vidarbha Samshodhan Mandal.
- Grewal, J. S. (2005). The State and Society in Medieval India. Oxford University Press. ISBN 978-0-19-566720-2.
- Fryer, John (1992). A New Account of East India and Persia: Being Nine Years' Travels, 1672-1681, Volume 1. Asian Educational Services. ISBN 9788120607965.
- Kulakarni, A. Rā (2006). Explorations in the Deccan History. Pragati Publications. ISBN 978-81-7307-108-9.
