= Lezim =

Folk dance form from Maharashtra, India

Lezim or lazium is a folk dance form, from the state of Maharashtra in India.

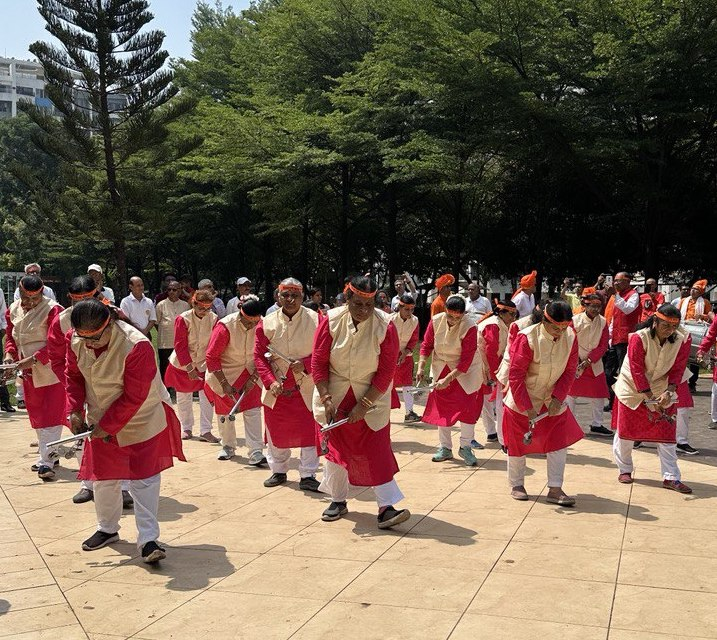
Lezim dancers in formation

Sometimes also spelt as "Lezium", Lezim dancers carry a small musical instrument with jingling cymbals called the Lezim or lezium, after which the dance form is named. There are a minimum of 20 dancers in a traditional lezim. This dance is named after a wooden idiophone to which thin metal discs are fitted that produce a jingling sound and the dancers use this while classical dancing. Dholki, a drum instrument, is used as the primary percussion music. It is performed dressed in colourful costumes. The dance is frequently used as a fitness drill by schools in Maharashtra, militias and other institutions because it involves many calisthenic moves and can be quite strenuous.

Lezim is more of a vigorous physical exercise and drill than a dance; the formations can be in twos, fours and even in a circle. Historically, there were a few variations of the lezim practiced in the villages of Maharashtra and parts of Gujarat, however these are rarely used today. One variation used a 2.5 feet long bamboo pole (Reedh) with an iron chain (Dhanusyasarakhi). This was used more as a form of exercise than dance, as the lezim was heavy. Such lezims were invariably hand made.

Another variation of the lezim (called Koyande) used a wooden pole, 15 to 18 inches long, with both ends punctured and an iron linked chain weighing about 1 kg running through it. They also contained a 6 inches long hand chain (salaisakhali), through which the four fingers fit snugly.

The rural form of the dance usually consists of lezim dancers in two rows, repeating a sequence of steps, changing the steps every few beats. Thus, a 5-minute lezim performance can consist of 25 different steps danced in unison.

Other variations include dancing the lezim in four rows, in a single circle formation (Nartakasamuhanni), or in concentric circles formations (samuhanrtyanta nartakam) (similar to the garbha dance), with each dancer twirling and dancers of opposite rows often playing lezim with each other. Changes in steps are "announced" by a ring leader using a whistle.

Lezim is especially popular in rural Maharashtra, often played during the Ganesh festival (गणेशोत्सव), in village Jatras (religious processions) and in schools as part of the fitness regime.

There are three main types of Lezim - military lezim (popular in Baroda and mostly used as a martial art for defense), talathekya and samanyajananna. The first lezim performance to an international audience was presented at the ninth Asian Games (1982, Delhi) where 400 of the best Maharashtrian lezim players gave a demonstration .

The local names of the components of the Lezim dance are:

1. Lezim - approximately one-half inch of wood pole (todanna bandhaleli) and a chain called adakavalelya. Striking the chains causes a cymbal like sound
2. halagi - a carmavadya
3. drum - a narrow drum.
4. cymbals - talasarakhe, but larger and with a musical pasarata mouth.

== See also ==
- List of Indian folk dances
