= Moropant Trimbak Pingle =

Peshwa of the Maratha Empire from 1674 to 1683

Shrimant Peshwa Moropant Trimbak Pingale

1st Peshwa of the Marathas
- In office 6 June 1674–1683
- Monarchs: Shivaji, Sambhaji
- Preceded by: Position established
- Succeeded by: Moreshvar Pingale

Personal details
- Born: c. 1620 Nimgaon
- Died: 1683 Raigad Fort, Raigad, Maratha Empire (present-day Maharashtra, India)
- Children: Nilakanth Moreshvar Pingale (son); Bahiroji Pingale (son)
- Parent: Trimbak Pingale (father)
- House: Pingale

Military service
- Battles/wars: Battle of Pratapgarh; Battle of Salher

Moropant Trimbak Pingale (1620–1683), was a Maratha military commander who also served as the first Peshwa of the Maratha Empire during the reign of Chhatrapati Shivaji as a member of Ashta Pradhan (Council of Eight Ministers).

== Early life ==
Moropant Trimbak Pingle was born to a Deshastha Brahmin family in 1620 Nimgaon. In 1647, he joined Chhatrapati Shivaji Maharaj in establishing the Maratha Empire.

== Military career ==
He was one of the warriors who participated in the successful 1659 battle of Shivaji Maharaj's forces against the forces of Bijapur's Adil Shah which immediately followed Adil Shah's general Afzal Khān's death at Jāwali. He also participated in the battles at Trimbakeshwar Fort and Wāni-Dindori against the Mughal Empire. He participated in Shivaji's invasion of Surat in 1664. He also participated in the Battle of Salher. Moropant surrounded and attacked the 25,000 strong Mughal infantry at Salher with his 20,000 infantry. Prominent Maratha Sardar and Shivaji's childhood friend Suryaji Kakde was killed by a Zamburak cannon in the battle. Chhatrapati Sambhaji son of Shivaji stayed with Moropant's relatives in Mathura after their escape from Agra.. Moropant introduced sound revenue administration to Shivaji's regime, and played an important role in resource planning concerning defenses and maintenance of strategic forts. He was also responsible for the construction and administration of Pratapgad. At Chhatrapati Shivaji's death, Moropant Pingale was working as a supervisor of fort development activities in Nashik District for the Salher-Mulher forts. Under Shivaji Maharaj's successor, Chhatrapati Sambhaji, he also participated in the battle with of Burhanpur in 1681 which resulted in the sacking of the important Mughal trade centre of Burhanpur.

== Popular culture ==
=== Films and television ===
- He was portrayed by Nandkumar Patil in the 2017-2020 Indian historical serial Swarajyarakshak Sambhaji, based on the life of Sambhaji.
- In the 2022 Indian Marathi-language historical film Sher Shivraj, he is portrayed by Sachin Deshpande.
