= Chitnis =

Chitnis, Chitnavis or Chitnavese was a title conferred on one who held the office of Secretary of State or "political secretary" in the Maratha Empire. The post was considered to be of equal status to the post of the council of eight ministers or Ashta Pradhan although it was not part of that group. The office of the Chitnis was responsible for all political and diplomatic correspondence but like other officers of the state they were also obligated to perform Military service.

Prachi Deshpande, a prominent Indian historian, writes:

"As Malhar Ramrao observed, it was not enough for the Chitnis to be literate; his office was political, and he had to often read the king's mind and anticipate his intentions, which required much imagination and intelligence."

This surname may be found among Deshastha Rigvedi Brahmin (DRB) and Chandraseniya Kayastha Prabhu (CKP) communities.

== Notable people ==
Notable people with the surname include:

- Atul Chitnis (1962–2013), German-born Indian technologist
- Chetan Eknath Chitnis (born 1961), Indian biologist
- Eknath Vasant Chitnis, Indian space scientist
- Leela Chitnis (1909–2003), Indian actress
- Pratap Chitnis, Baron Chitnis (1936–2013), British politician
- Siddharth Chitnis (born 1987), Indian cricketer
- Archana Chitnis, BJP Politician
- Khando Ballal Chitnis High-Ranking Diplomat and Chitnis in the Maratha Empire
