= Moreshvar Pingale =

Peshwa of the Maratha Empire from 1683 to 1689

Shrimant Peshwa Nilakanth Moreshvar Pingale
- नीलकंठ मोरेश्वर पिंगळे

2nd Peshwa of the Maratha Empire
- In office 1683 – 11 March 1689
- Monarch: Sambhaji
- Preceded by: Moropant Trimbak Pingle
- Succeeded by: Ramchandra Pant Amatya

Personal details
- Parent: Moropant Trimbak Pingale (father)

Nilakanth Moreshvar Pingale was the second Peshwa of the Maratha Empire. He was the son of Moropant Trimbak Pingale and the elder brother of Bahiroji Pingale.
