= Shivrai =

Copper currency of the Maratha Empire

- Maratha Empire
- Value: 1/74 to 1/80 of rupee
- Composition: Copper
- Years of minting: 1674 - 1830
- Circulation: 1674 – late 1890s

Obverse
- Design: "Shri / Raja / Shiv" or "Shri / Raja" in Devanagari script, in three or two rows.

Reverse
- Design: Chhatra / Pati in Devanagari script, in two rows.

Shivrai was a copper coin minted during the rule of Marathas and remained in circulation till the end of the 19th century, primarily in the western region of modern-day Maharashtra.

Before 1830s, shivrai was valued at 1/74 to 1/80 of a rupee. There are 150 different types of shivrai extant to date. In 1885, the British government ordered all local revenue collectors (Mamlatdars) to collect all shivrais and deposit them in treasury. The purpose of this was to bring the new pice, worth 1/64 of rupee, in currency by eliminating this native rival. In 1890, Rev. Abbott collected and studied around 25,000 shivrais. He mentions that they were still in circulation. The shivrai remained in circulation till the end of the 19th century.

== Shivaji's Shivrai ==
Shivaji's Shivrai
- Maratha Empire
- Value: 1/74th to 1/80th of Rupee
- Diameter: 23 mm
- Thickness: 4 mm
- Composition: Copper
- Circulation: 1674 - 1890s

Obverse
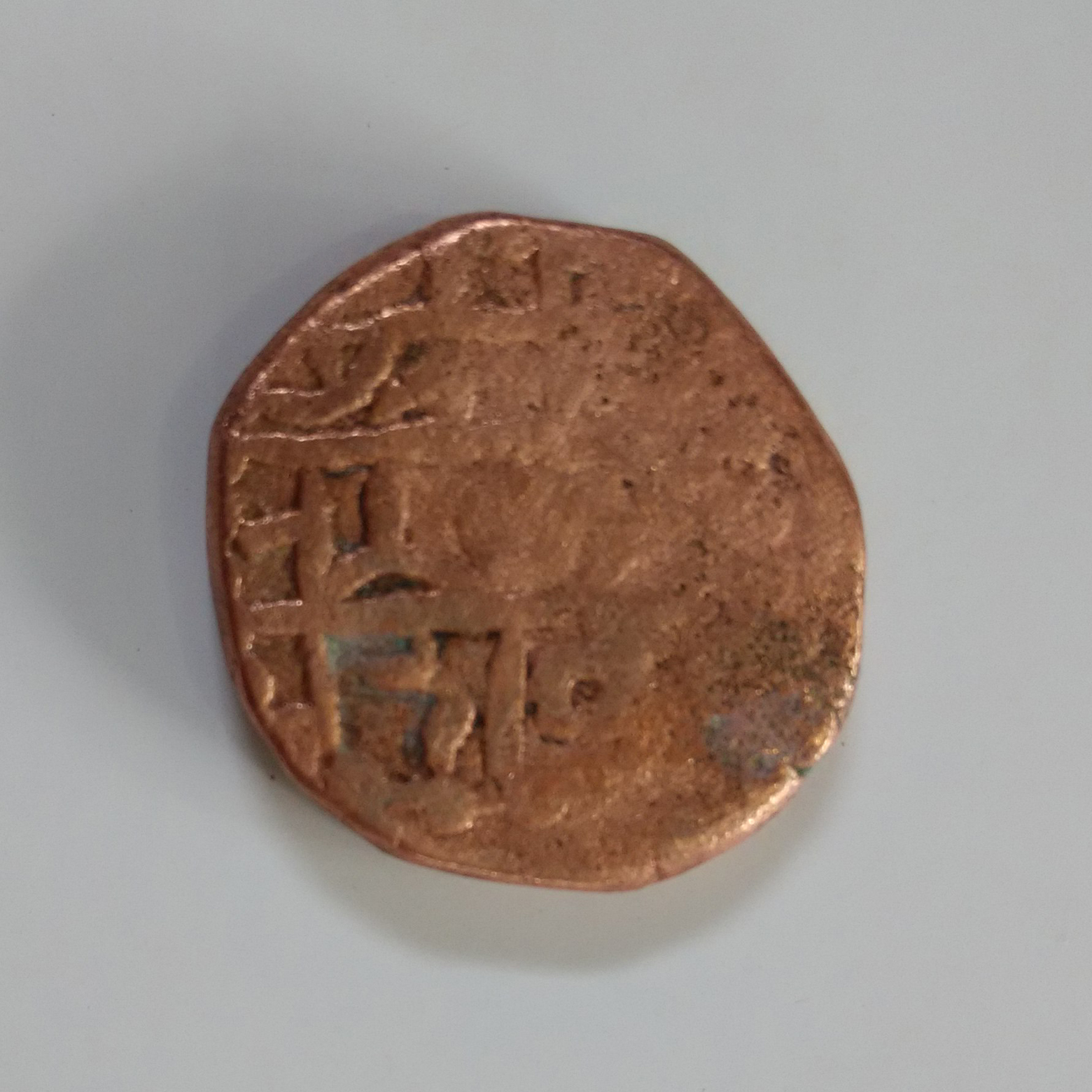
- Design: Shri / Raja / Shiv in Devanagari script, in three rows.
- Design date: 1674

Reverse
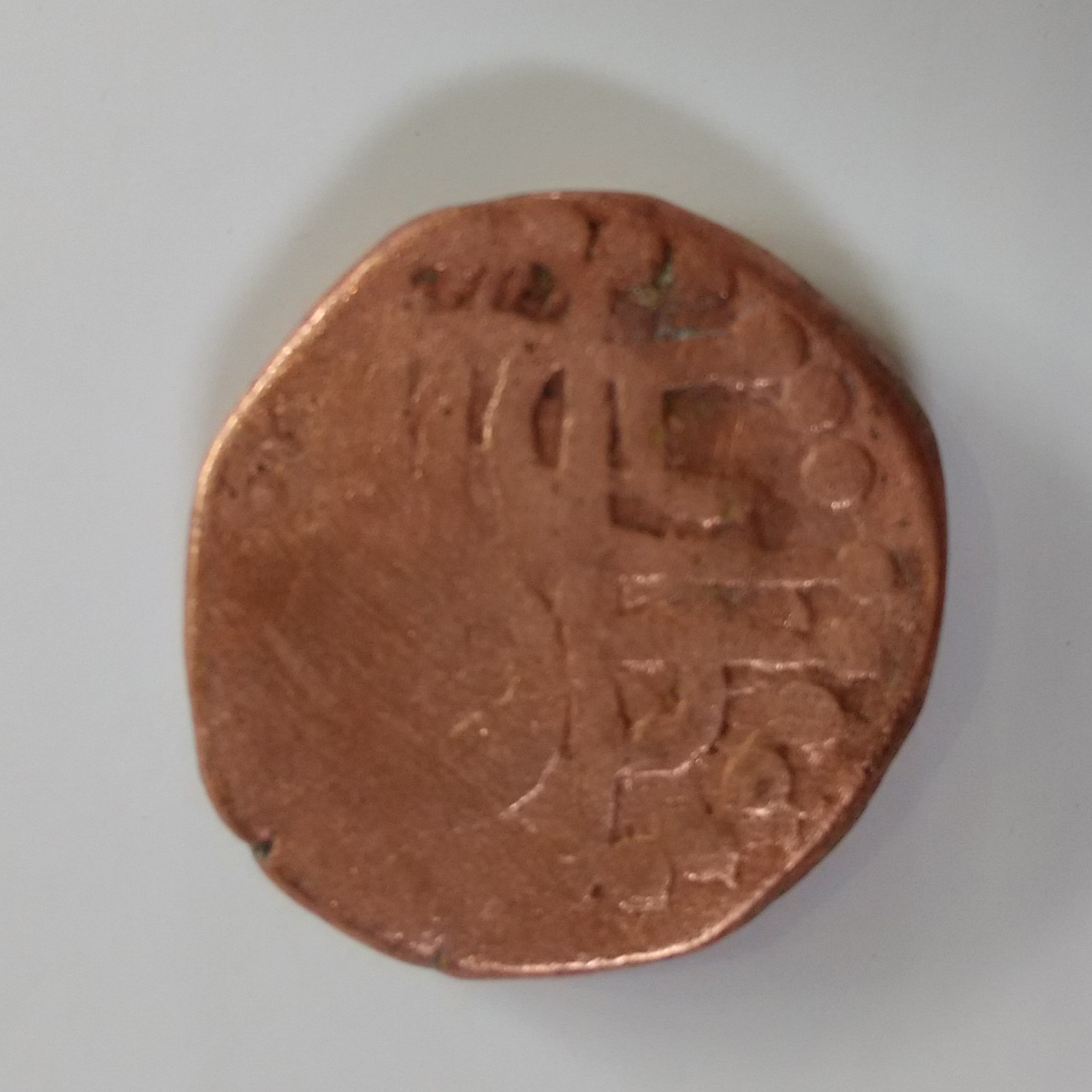
- Design: Chhatra / Pati in Devanagari script, in two rows.
- Design date: 1674

When the Maratha warrior Shivaji became Chhatrapati of the Maratha empire, as a symbol of sovereignty, the Rajyaabhisheka Shaka (The Coronation Era) was started. On the occasion of coronation, special coins were minted, including a gold coin called Shivrai Hon. These coins have Shri Raja ShivaChhatrapati, in Devanagari, inscribed on them.

== Dudandi Shivrai ==
Dudandi Shivrai
- Maratha Empire
- Value: 1/74th to 1/80th of Rupee
- Diameter: 20 mm
- Thickness: 4 mm
- Composition: Copper
- Years of minting: Mid 18th Century - 1818
- Circulation: Mid 18th to late 19th century

Obverse
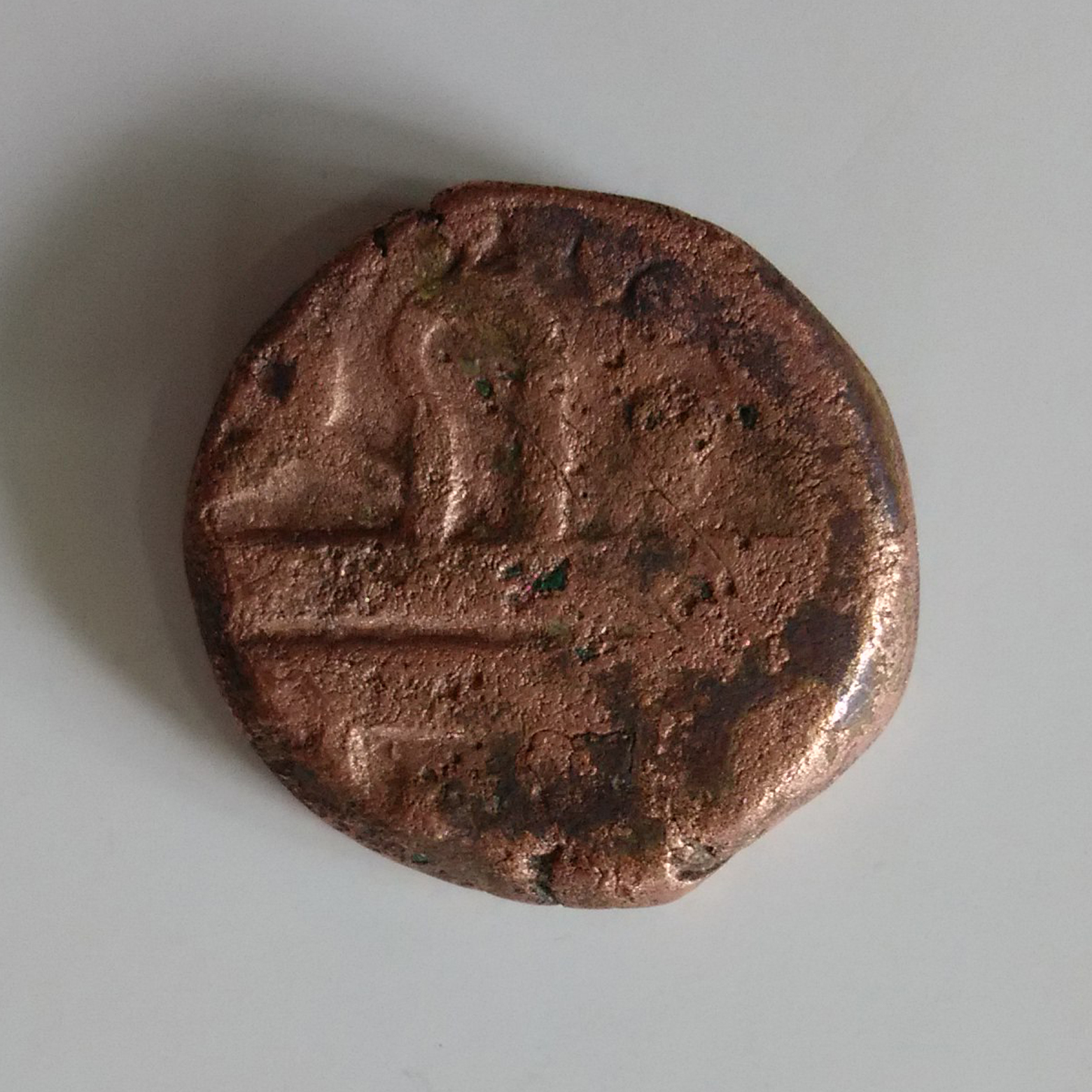
- Design: Shri / Raja in Devanagari script, in two rows. "Shri" is underlined.

Reverse
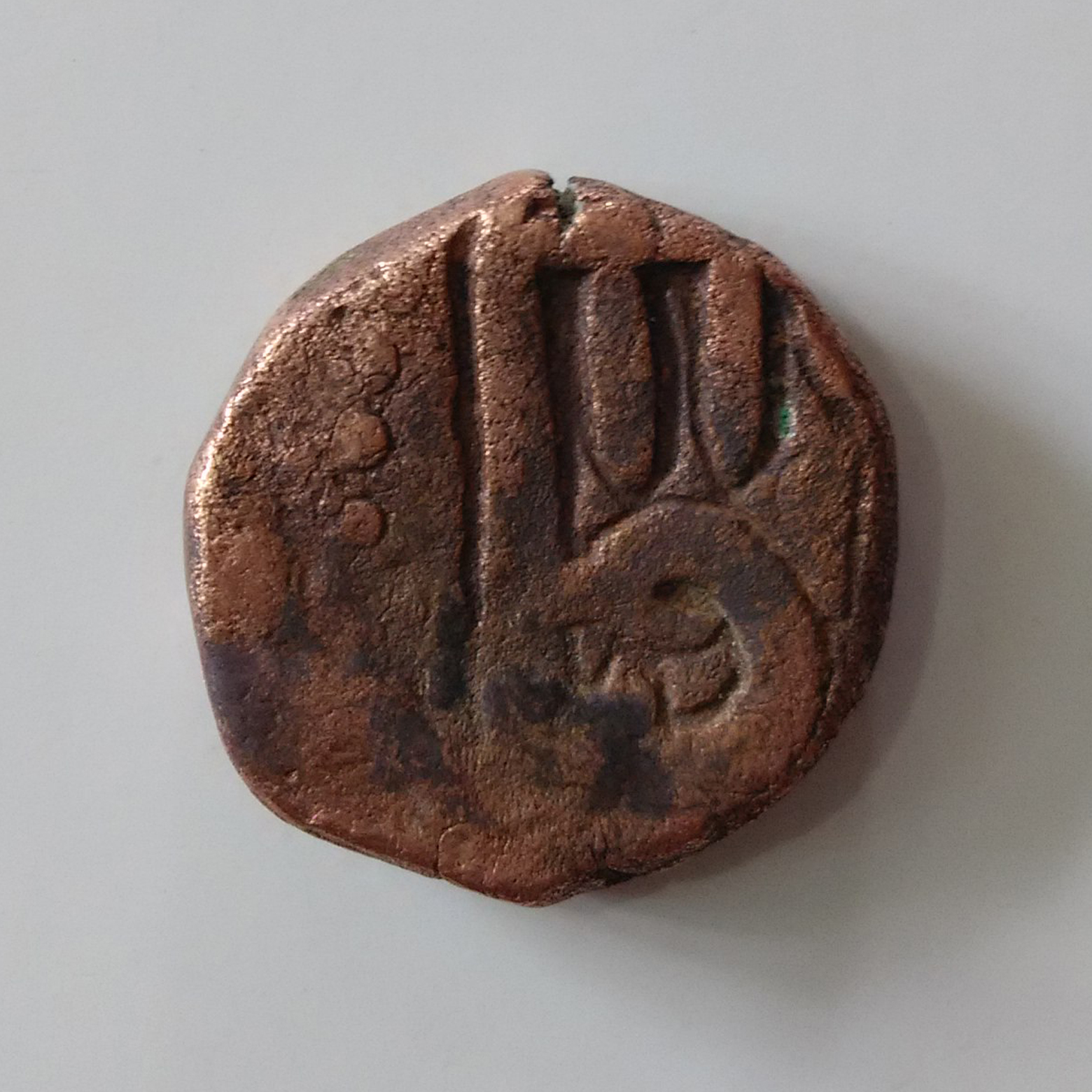
- Design: Chhatra / Pati in Devanagari script, in two rows.

Dudandi Shivrais (Marathi: दुदांडी शिवराई) were minted during Peshwa period. Dudandi literally means two-bars. The "Shri" at the top of the obverse is underlined. This horizontal line, combined with the horizontal heading line of the word "Raja", gives us an impression of "Double bars", hence the term "Dudandi".

== EIC's Shivrai ==
EIC's Shivrai
- Company Raj
- Value: 1/74th to 1/80th of Rupee
- Mass: 9.80 g
- Diameter: 19 mm
- Composition: Copper
- Years of minting: 1820 - 1830
- Circulation: 1820 - Late 1890s

Obverse
- Design: Numeric Fasli year, "Raja" in Devanagari

Reverse
- Design: Chhatra / Pati in Devanagari script, in two rows.

The British East India Company minted Shivrais at Poona during the period of 1820–1830. Unlike Earlier Shivrais, these contained year of minting on it. The dotted collar of earlier Shivrais is also absent. The year was given in Fasli era.
