= Peshwa =

Prime Minister of the Maratha Empire

Peshwa of the Maratha Empire
- Flag

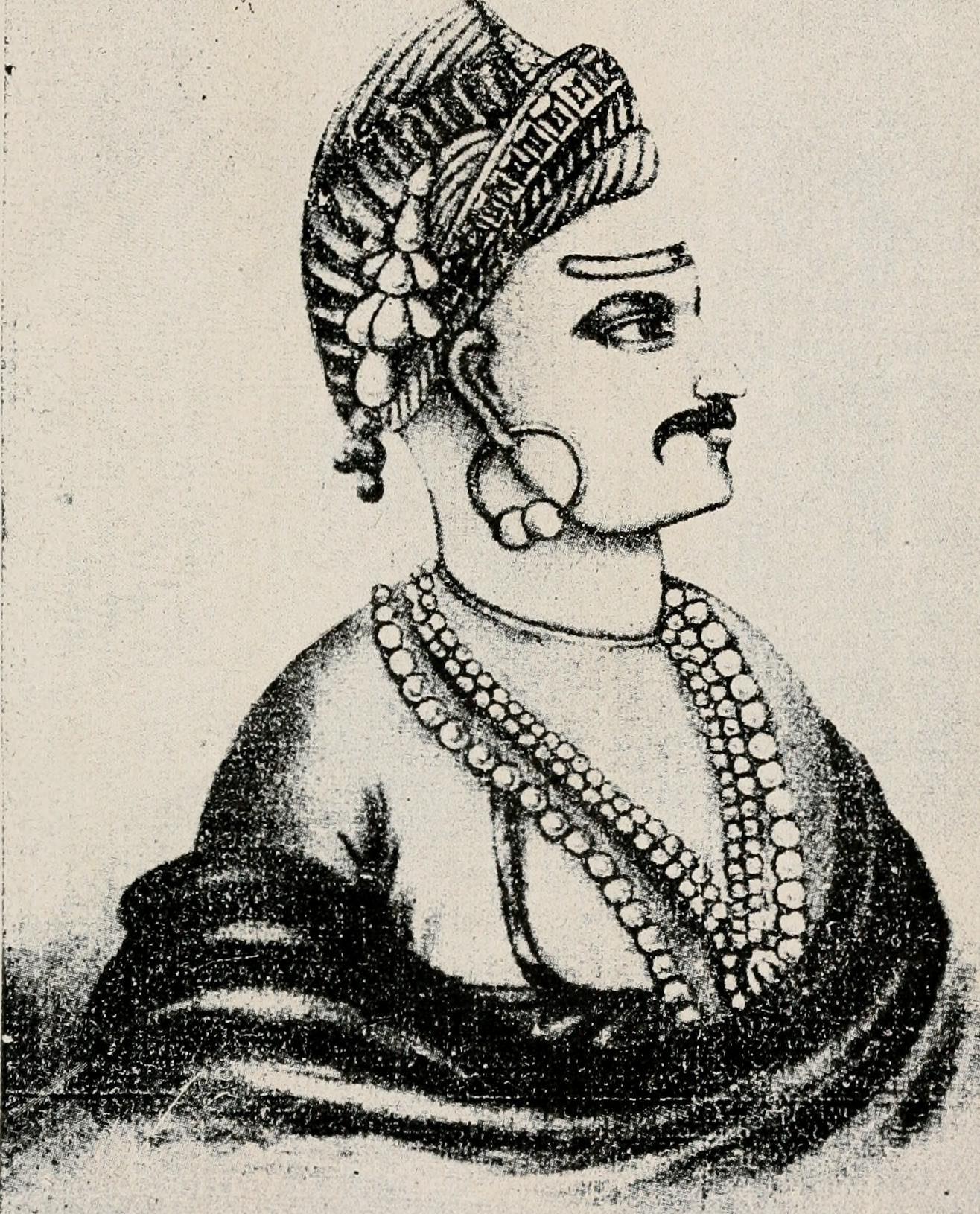
- Last to serve Baji Rao II; 6 December 1796 – 3 June 1818
- Residence: Shaniwar Wada, Pune (1732–1818); Bithur, Kanpur (1818–57)
- Appointer: Chhatrapati (until 1761); Hereditary (1761–1818)
- Formation: 6 June 1674
- First holder: Moropant Trimbak Pingle
- Final holder: Baji Rao II; Nana Saheb II (tituler)
- Abolished: 3 June 1818 (de jure); 16 July 1857 (de facto)
- Succession: The Peshwas split into 3 dynasties after abolishment

The Peshwa (Note: (pronunciation: [pe(ː)ʃʋaː])) was the second highest office in the Maratha Empire (1674-1818), next in rank and prestige after the Chhatrapati. Initially serving as the appointed prime minister in the Maratha Kingdom, the office became hereditary when Shahu gave the seat of Peshwa to Bajirao Ballal. During the reign of Shahu, the office of Peshwas were handed more responsibilities to keep the Jagirdars and Vatandars from rebelling. After the death of Shahu I the empire had no male heir apparent; hence the duty of maintaining peace lay with the Peshwas till the heir apparent (Rajaram II) was of age. The Peshwas from the time of Balaji Rao became the supreme authority in Maratha empire and the Chhatrapati's position became nominal.

All Peshwas during the rule of Shivaji, Sambhaji and Rajaram belonged to Marathi Deshastha Brahmin community. The first Peshwa was Moropant Pingle, who was appointed as the head of the Ashta Pradhan (council of eight ministers) by Shivaji, the founder of the Maratha Kingdom. The initial Peshwas were all ministers who served as the chief executives to the king. The later Peshwas held the highest administrative office and also controlled the Maratha confederacy. Under the Bhat family, the Peshwas became the de facto hereditary administrators of the Confederacy. The Peshwa's office was most powerful under Baji Rao I (r. 1720–1740).

Under Peshwa administration and with the support of several key generals and diplomats, the Maratha Confederacy reached its zenith, ruling majority of the Indian subcontinent. The subsequent Peshwas brought in autonomy and as a result later on many states were controlled and administered by the Maratha chiefs such as Scindias, Holkars, Gaekwads and Bhonsles though they often held allegiance to the Peshwa. The Peshwas decline was initiated when Raghunath Rao (Son of the great Baji Rao I) along with his wife Anandibai blinded by greed, had his 18 year-old nephew Narayanrao assassinated.

== First use ==
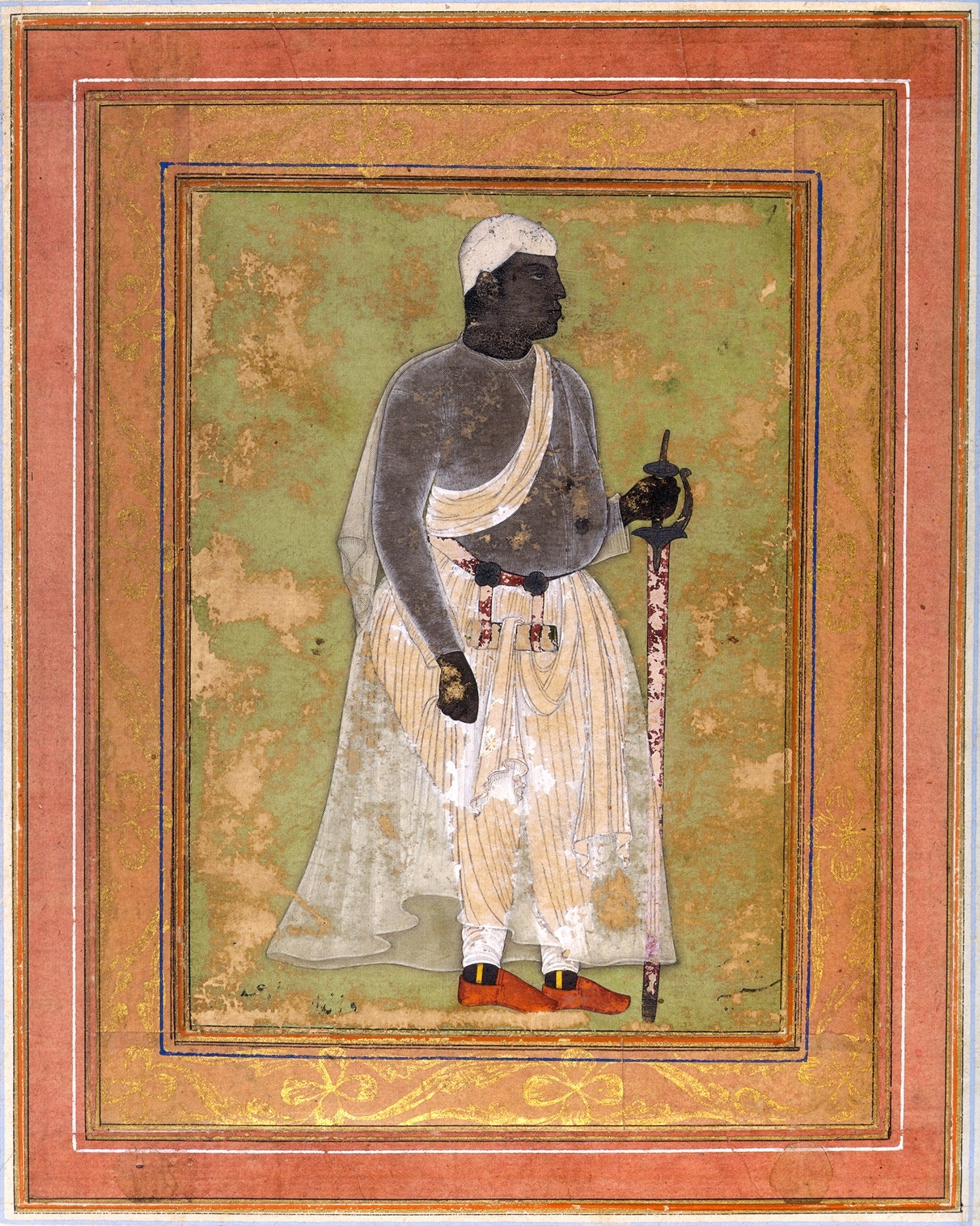
Malik Ambar, Peshwa of the Ahmadnagar Sultanate

The word Peshwa is from Persian پیشوا pēshwā, meaning "foremost, leader". The term was inherited from the political vocabulary of previous Persianate empires operating in the Deccan. As early as 1397, the Bahmani Sultanate designated its prime minister as "peshwa". In the 16th and 17th centuries, this practice was continued by the Ahmednagar Sultanate and the Bijapur Sultanate, both successor states of the Bahmani Sultanate. After the coronation of Shivaji in 1674, he appointed Moropant Trimbak Pingle as his first Peshwa. Shivaji renamed this designation as Pantpradhan in 1674 but this term was less commonly used. Moropant Trimbak Pingale's son, Nilopant Moreshvar Pingale, succeeded him during Sambhaji's rule after Moropant Pingle's death in 1683.

== Ramchandra Pant Amatya (Bawadekar) ==
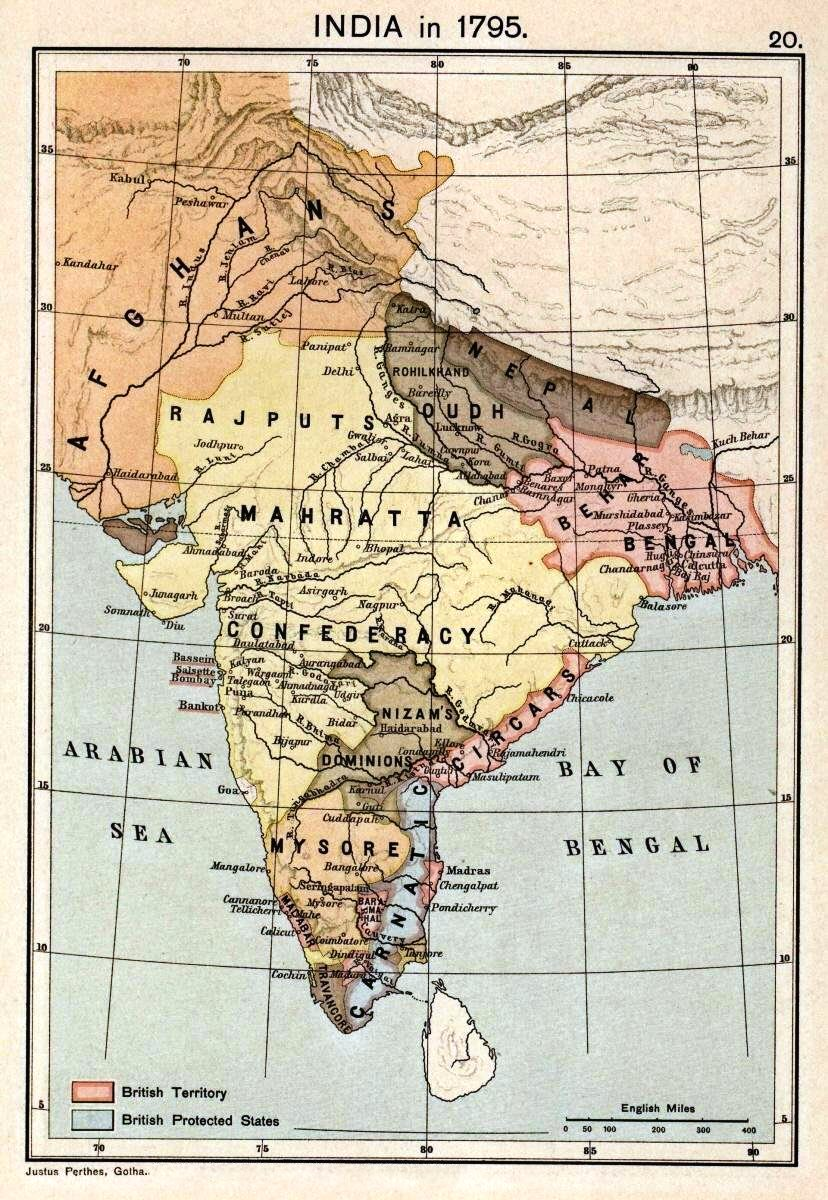
Extent of the Maratha Confederacy, 1795

Ramchandra Amatya recaptured many forts from the Mughals between 1690 and 1694, some in person, as well as personally conducting guerilla war techniques. When Rajaram I fled to Jinji in 1689, before leaving Maharashtra, he ordered Ramchandra Pant to safeguard the throne; and he managed the entire state under many challenges such as the Mughal influx, rebellions, and scarcity of food. With his help, Sachiv kept the Maratha State on a sound economic footing.

== Bhat Family ==
The Maratha war of succession between Tara Bai and Shahu resulted in latter's victory and assumption of Maratha throne as Chhatrapati. In 1713, Shahu appointed Balaji Vishwanath (Bhat), as Peshwa. The appointment of Balaji's son, Baji Rao I, as Peshwa in 1720 by Shahu made the position hereditary in the Bhat family. Baji Rao proved his loyalty by controlling the feudal chieftains who wanted independence from the Maratha Empire. The rebellion of General Trimbak Rao Dabhade, the senapati (commander in chief), over Chauthai (revenue collection) of Gujarat is one example of such internal Maratha feuds. The followers of Baji and Trimbak clashed at the Battle of Dabhoi on 1 April 1731, and Trimbak was killed. As reward, Shahu Maharaja gave the Peshwas and the Bhat family more responsibilities in the Maratha empire. who also appointed Baji Rao's son as Peshwa in 1740, gave considerable authority to the Peshwas to command the Maratha armies, and they responded well during his reigns.

== Lifestyle and political stature ==
The earlier Peshwas had a modest lifestyle in comparison to their Mughal and Nawabi counterparts. There is a Marathi legend about how Peshwa Bajirao I would always utilize the same amenities as his troops, often going to the extent of sharing the same food and going without it for 2–3 days at a time if his army shared the same fate. However this fraternity was largely reduced after the Maratha Resurrection and gradual prosperity of the Maratha Confederacy.

Contrary to belief, the Marathas were not fully committed to casteism and discrimination, as the support of all groups was required for waging wars and appropriate taxation in the Confederacy. The only major involvement in matters of caste was by Narayan Rao Peshwa, when he altered the disputed status of the Prabhus.

Politically, during the early days of the Peshwa, their direct involvement in everyday life and stronger hold over the empire ensured that they formed the right alliances, especially with the new foreign powers. Gradually due to the confederate structure, this political wit was often influenced by the Maratha nobles, or by political advisors and ministers like Nana Fadnavis.

== Rebellions ==
In 1760, the peace of Peshwa government was broken by a rising of Kolis under their Naik Javji Bamble. Javji withdrew to the hills and organised a series of gang robberies, causing widespread terror and misery throughout the country. For twenty years he held out bravely, defeating and killing the generals the Peshwa's Government sent against him. At last he was so hotly pursued that, on the advice of Dhondo Gopal, the Peshwa's governor at Nasik, he surrendered all his forts to Tukoji Holkar and, through Holkar's influence, was pardoned and placed in military and police charge of a district of sixty villages with powers of life and death outlaws. In 1798, a fresh disturbance took place among the Kolis. The leader of this outbreak was Ramji Naik Bhangria, who was an abler and more daring man than his predecessors, and succeeded in baffling all the efforts of the Government officers to seize him. As force seemed hopeless, the Government offered Ramji a pardon and gave him an important police post.

== Legacy ==
The first Peshwa to receive the status of a Pantpradhan was Ramchandra Pant Amatya Bawdekar in 1689 by Rajaram. The first (Bhat) Deshmukh family Peshwa was Balaji Vishwanath (Bhat) Deshmukh. He was succeeded as Peshwa by his son Bajirao I. Baji Rao and his son, Balaji Baji Rao, oversaw the period of greatest Maratha expansion, brought to an end by the Marathas' defeat by an Afghan army at the Third Battle of Panipat in 1761. The last Peshwa, Baji Rao II, was defeated by the British East India Company in the Battle of Khadki which was a part of Third Anglo-Maratha War (1817–1818). The Peshwa's land (Peshwai) was annexed to the British East India Company's Bombay province, and Bajirao II, the Peshwa was pensioned off.

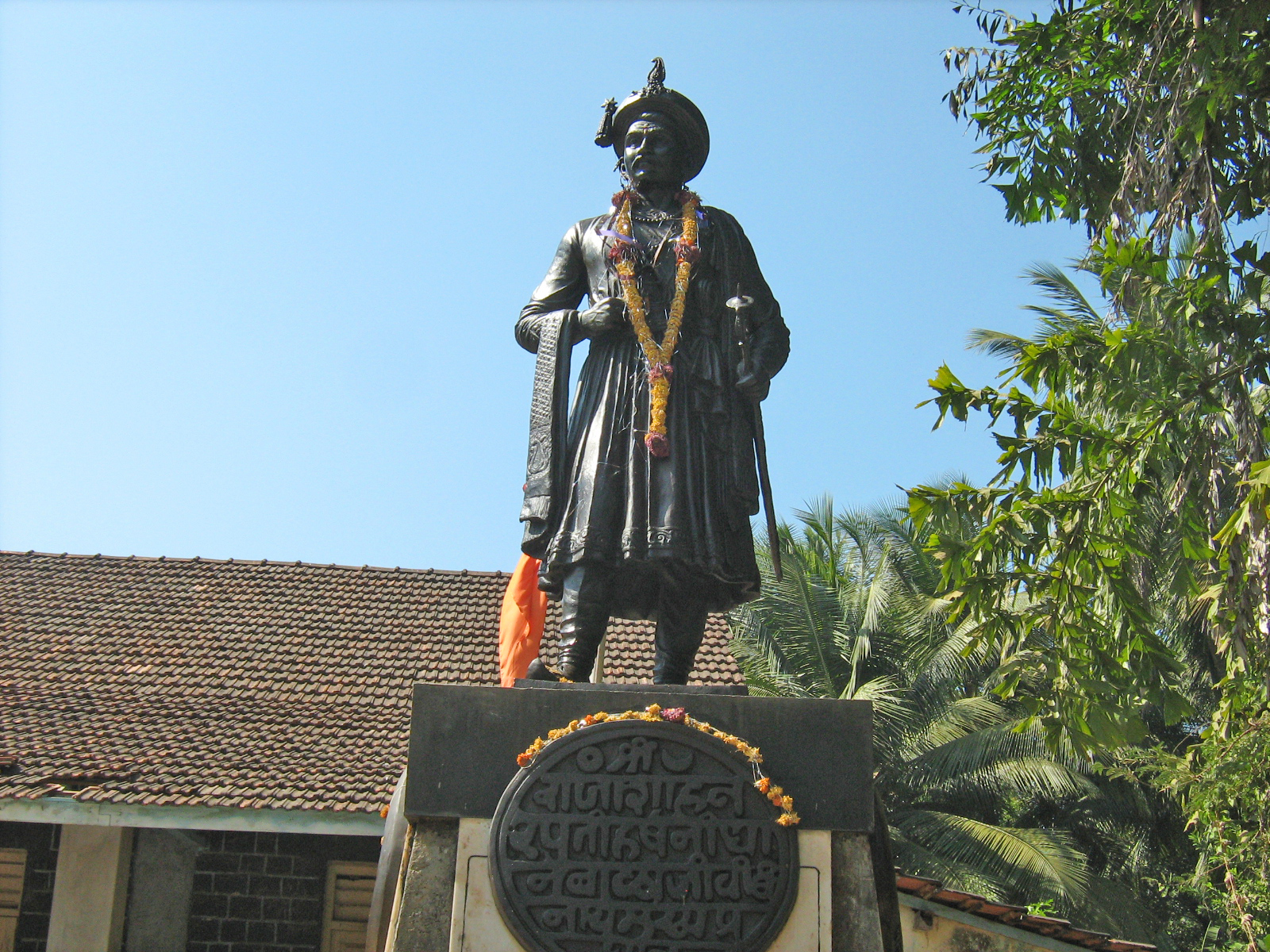
Statue of Balaji Vishwanath, the first Peshwa from the Bhat family, at Shrivardhan, Raigad district, Maharashtra, India.

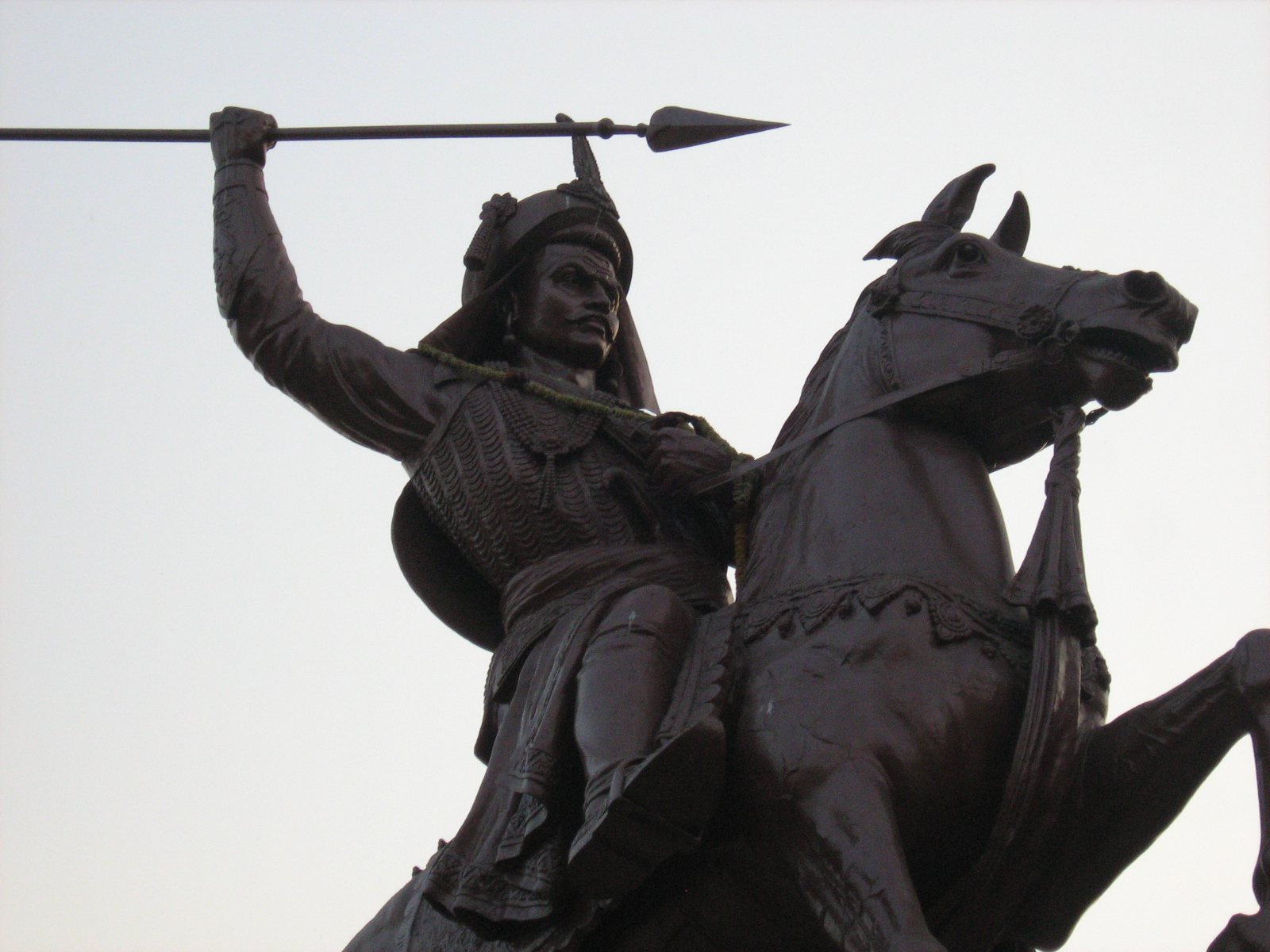
Statue of Bajirao I, the second Peshwa from the Bhat family, outside Shaniwar Wada, Pune, Maharashtra, India.

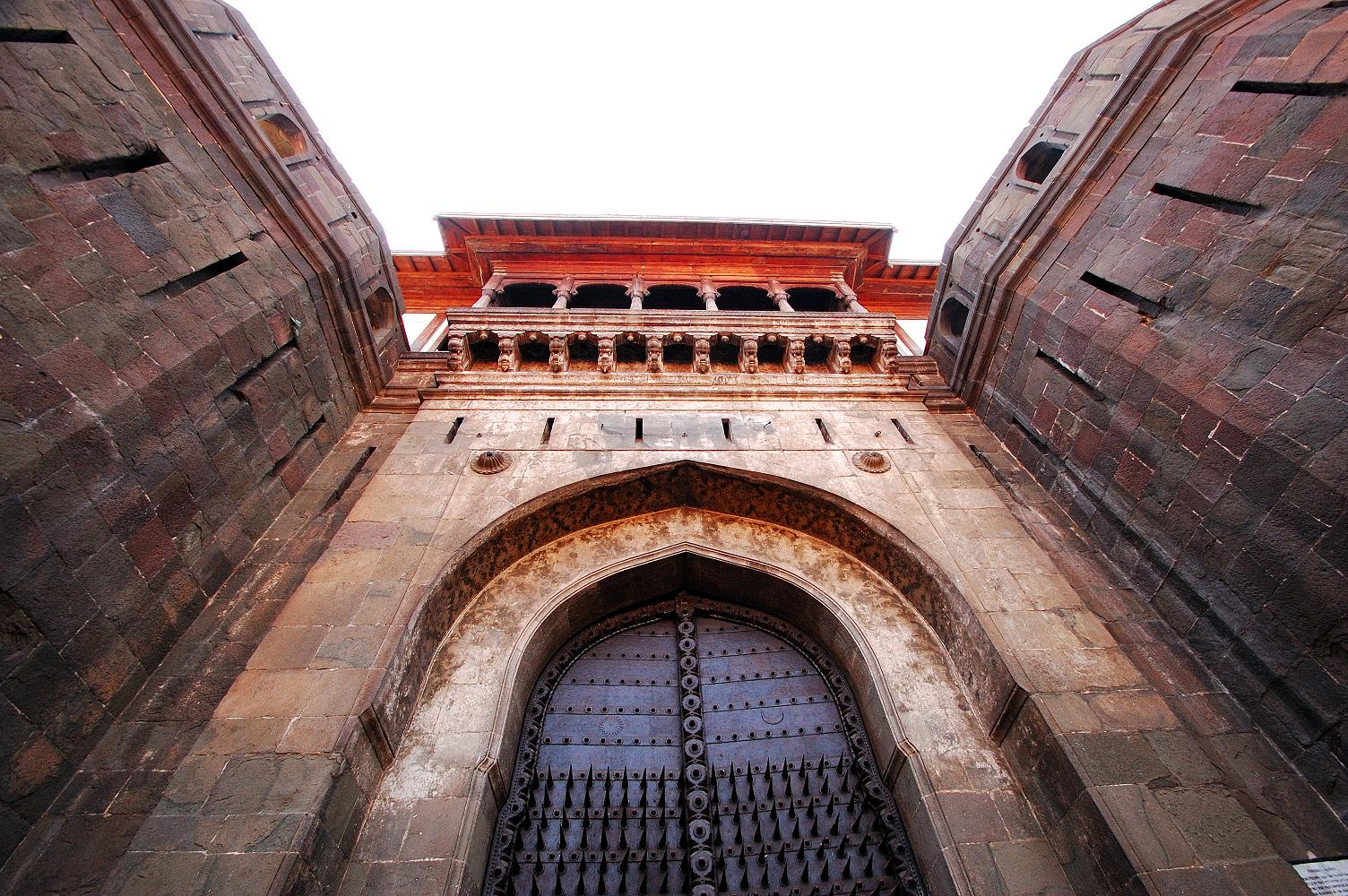
Shaniwar Wada's Delhi Gate. It was the seat of the Peshwas at Pune, Maharashtra, India.

== List of Peshwas ==
Sr.	Name	Reign Began C.E.	Reign Ended C.E.
1	Moropant Trimbak Pingle	1674	1683
2	Nilakanth Moreshvar Pingale	1683	1689
3	Ramchandra Pant Amatya	1689	1708
4	Bahiroji Pingale	1708	1711
5	Parshuram Trimbak Kulkarni	1711	1713

=== Hereditary Peshwas from Bhat family ===
Sr.	Name	Particulars	Reign Began C.E.	Reign Ended C.E.	Portrait
6	Balaji Vishwanath (Sixth appointed Peshwa)	Assisted the Syed Brothers in deposing the Mughal Emperor Farrukhsiyar in 1719	1713	1720	
7	Baji Rao I (Seventh appointed Peshwa)	Known as Thorle (elder) Bajirao and acknowledged as the most influential of the nine Peshwas. Said to have fought for the establishment of "Hindu Pad Padshahi"(Hindu Empire). Helped conquer Central India (Malwa) and Rajputana and extended his dominions into Gujarat in the northwest and Deccan in the south. Attacked Delhi in 1737. Fought in over 41 battles and is one of the few to have never lost a single battle. Died at the age of 40 of sudden fever in camp en route to Delhi; he has been commemorated in the form of an equestrian statue erected at Shaniwar Wada in Pune.	1720	1740	
8	Balaji Bajirao (Eighth appointed Peshwa)	Known as Nanasaheb Peshwa. Managed to extend the Maratha territories into most of North-West, East and Central India. Captured Attock on the banks of the Indus River and Peshawar in 1758 in the Battle of Attock. Under his leadership, the Maratha Empire reached its peak but his general and cousin lost the Third Battle of Panipat against Ahmad Shah Abdali in 1761. Contributed to the development of the city of Pune which was the seat of the Peshwas. Built the famous Parvati Temple, Lakdi Pool and established Nana Peth (area) in Pune. Built a water reservoir near Katraj to provide clean water to Pune city; this 250-year-old system is still functioning.	1740	1761	
9	Madhav-Rao I (First hereditary Peshwa)	Fraught with internal dissensions and successful Wars with the Nizam. During his tenure, Maratha power recovered from the losses suffered during the Third Battle of Panipat, a phenomenon known as Maratha Resurrection. Repaired the recently weakened administration, treasury, and accounts of the Maratha Empire. He died of tuberculosis in 1772; a memorial commemorating his greatness stands at Peshwe Park in Pune. One of the theory says that he was assassinated by his aunt, Anandi Bai (wife of Raghunath Rao).	1761	1772	
10	Narayan-Rao	Assassinated by Gardi guards. Raghunath Rao was in favor of just kidnapping him but Anandi Bai (wife of Raghunath Rao) decided to kill him. Narayan Rao was assassinated in Shanivar Wada. Nowadays, it is considered one of the haunted place in Maharashtra.	1772	1773	
11	Raghunath-Rao	Responsible for extending the Maratha empire to the zenith in the North as a General and also saw the decline of Maratha power in North India. Deposed by Nana Phadnis and 11 other administrators in what is now called "The Barbhai Conspiracy".	1773	1774	
12	Madhav-Rao II	Appointed Peshwa as an infant with a council of Maratha Generals and ministers as regents. Era dominated by the political intrigues of Nana Phadnis. Saw the resurgence of Maratha power in North India.	1774	1796	
13	Baji Rao II	1st Reign – Was defeated by Yashwantrao Holkar, ruler of Indore, at the Battle of Poona. Fled to British protection, and in December 1802, concluded the Treaty of Bassein with the British East India Company, ceding territory for the maintenance of a subsidiary force and agreeing to treaty with no other power. This provoked the Second Anglo-Maratha War that began the breakup of the Maratha confederacy.	1796	1802	
–	Amrut Rao (Appointed as Peshwa by Yashwantrao Holkar)	Appointed Peshwa by Yashwantrao Holkar after defeating Baji Rao II and Daulat Rao Sindhia in Battle of Poona.	1802	1803	
13	Baji Rao II	2nd Reign – During his second reign began the Third Anglo-Maratha War. After the defeat at the Battle of Koregaon in January 1818, he was on the run from the British. Eventually, the British took over his dominion and made the Maratha King Pratap Singh of Satara declare in favour of the British. This ended the Peshwa's legal position as head of the Maratha confederacy. On 3 June 1818, Baji Rao surrendered to the British; he was banished to Bithur near Kanpur.	1803	1851	
14	Nana Sahib (Pretender to the position of Peshwa)	Was a leader during the Indian Uprising of 1857. As the adopted son of the exiled Maratha Peshwa Baji Rao II, he sought to restore the Maratha confederacy and the Peshwa tradition.	1851	1857	

== Notable generals and diplomats ==
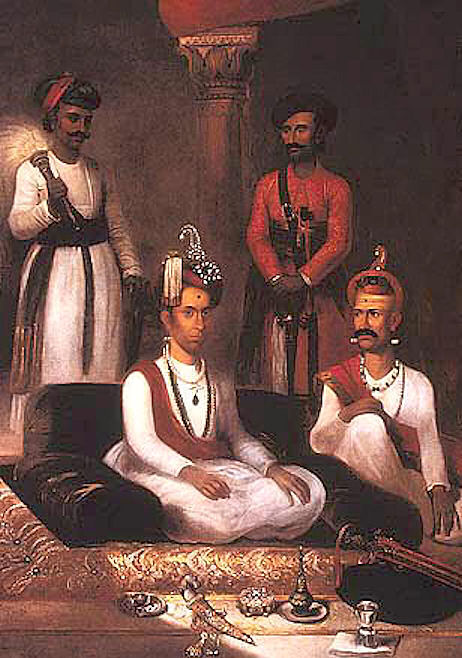
His Highness Shrimant Sawai Madhavrao Peshwa or Madhav Rao II Narayan and his Prime minister Nana Phadnavis, with two attendants at Pune.

- Khando Ballal Chitnis
- Javji Bamble
- Annaji Datto Sachiv
- Balaji Kunjar
- Bapu Gokhale
- Govind Pant Bundela
- Ibrahim Khan Gardi
- Mahadaji Shinde
- Malhar Rao Holkar
- Nana Phadnawis
- Niranjan Madhav Parasnis
- Parshuram Pant Pratinidhi
- Sakharam Hari Gupte
- Pilaji Rao Gaekwad
- Ranoji Scindia
- Sadashivrao Bhau
- Santaji Ghorpade
- Shamsher Bahadur
- Visaji Krushna Biniwale

== In popular culture ==
- Kaustubh Kasture has written a book in marathi titled "Peshwai-Maharashtrachya Itihasatil Ek Suvarnapan" based on Peshwai.
- Pramod Oak has written a book in marathi titled "Peshwe Gharanyacha Itihas" where he gave detailed information about Peshwas of Bhat family.

== See also ==
- Maratha titles
- Maratha clan system
- List of Maratha dynasties and states
- Peshawe Family

== Bibliography ==
- Kulkarni, A.R (1996). Marathas and the Marathas Country: The Marathas. Books & Books. ISBN 9788185016504.
- Joshi, Pandit Shankar (1980). Chhatrapati Sambhaji, 1657–1689 A.D. s.chand.
