= Bahiroji Pingale =

Peshwa of the Maratha Empire from 1708 to 1711

Bahirojipant Pingale

4th Peshwa of the Maratha Empire
- In office 1708–1711
- Monarch: Shahu I
- Preceded by: Ramchandra Pant Amatya
- Succeeded by: Parshuram Trimbak Kulkarni

Personal details
- Parent: Moropant Trimbak Pingle (father)

Bhaironji Pant Pingale was the younger son of Moropant Trimbak Pingle. His father, Moropant Pingle was the first Peshwa of Chhattrapati Shivaji.

When Kanhoji Angre attacked Satara in 1711, Bahiroji was taken a prisoner by him. Immediately Shahu I ordered Balaji Vishwanath to ensure his release and also gave Balaji Vishwanath authority in the form of the post of Peshwa, so that he could negotiate with Kanhoji Angre on behalf of the king.

His descendants, the Pingale family still lives in Kothrud Pune.
