= Fadnavis =

Fadnavis is a surname. Notable people with the surname include:

- Devendra Fadnavis (born 1970), 18th Chief Minister of Maharashtra state in India
- Nana Fadnavis (1742–1800), influential minister and statesman of the Maratha Empire during the Peshwa administration in Pune, India
- Shobha Fadnavis, member of Maharashtra Legislative Council and a former minister in Government of Maharashtra in India

See also may refer to:

- First Fadnavis ministry (31 October 2014 – 8 November 2019)
- Second Fadnavis ministry (23 November 2019 – 26 November 2019)
- Third Fadnavis ministry (05 December 2024 – present)
