= Old Mahabaleshwar =

Old Mahabaleshwar क्षेत्र महाबळेश्वर
- Hill Station, historical place
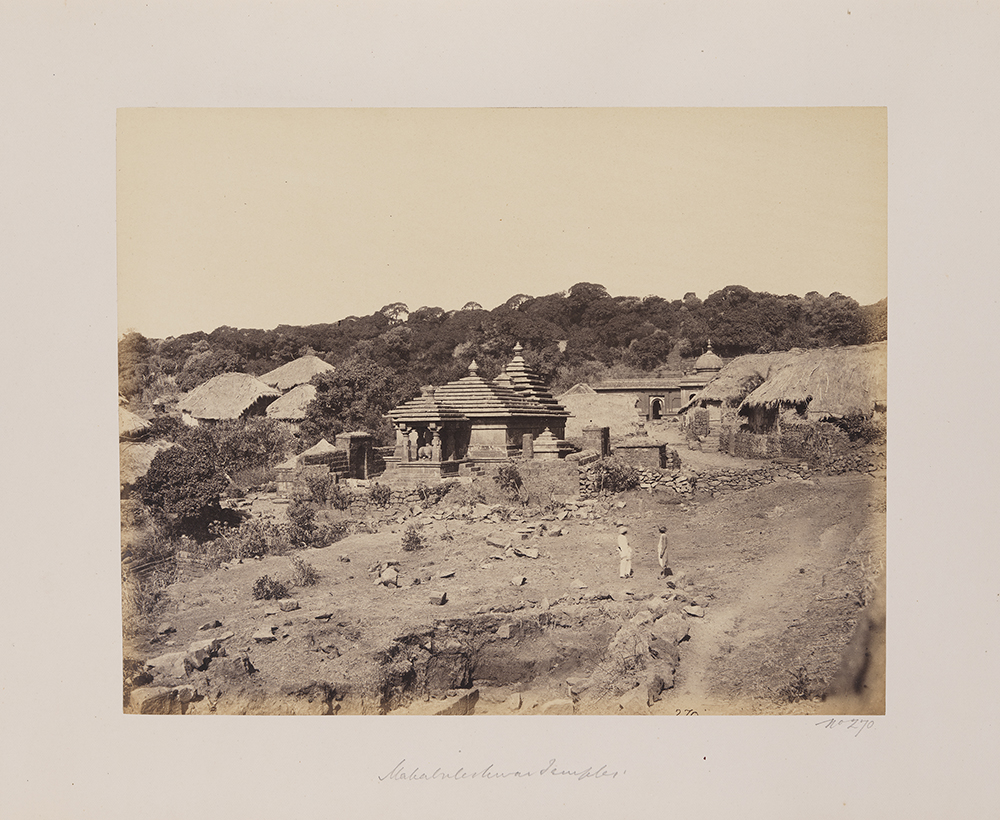
- Old photo of Atibaleshwar temple and Panchganga temple

- Location within Maharashtra
- Coordinates: 17.9237°N 73.6586°E
- Country: India
- State: Maharashtra
- District: Satara District
- Tehsil: Mahabaleshwar

Area
  - Total: 15.75 km^{2} (6.08 sq mi)

Population (2011)
  - Total: 785
  - Density: 49.8/km^{2} (129/sq mi)

Languages
  - Official: Marathi
- Time zone: UTC+5:30 (IST)
- PIN CODE: 412806
- Sex ratio: 92 females/100 males ♀/♂
- Literacy rate: 96%

Old Mahabaleshwar, also known as Kshetra Mahabaleshwar, is a historical village in Mahabaleshwar, of the Satara district in the Indian state of Maharashtra. It is a hill station located near the Western Ghats, seven kilometers from Mahabaleshwar. It is home to three temples: the Panchganga temple, Mahabaleshwar temple, and Krishna temple.

== Geography ==
Old Mahabaleshwar village is located at 17.9237°N 73.6586°E with an average elevation of 560 meters (1,840 feet).

Located about 150 km (93 mi) southwest of Pune and 340 km (210 mi) southeast of Mumbai, Old Mahabaleshwar is a plateau measuring 15 km^{2} (5.8 sq mi), surrounded by valleys on all sides. Its highest peak above sea level is known as the Hanuman Temple, which reaches a height of 1,439 m (4,721 ft).

Old Mahabaleshwar includes Tandulni-Anand van Bhavan, Sambhaji Nagar, Gera Colony, and Dr. Keni Colony.

== Religion ==
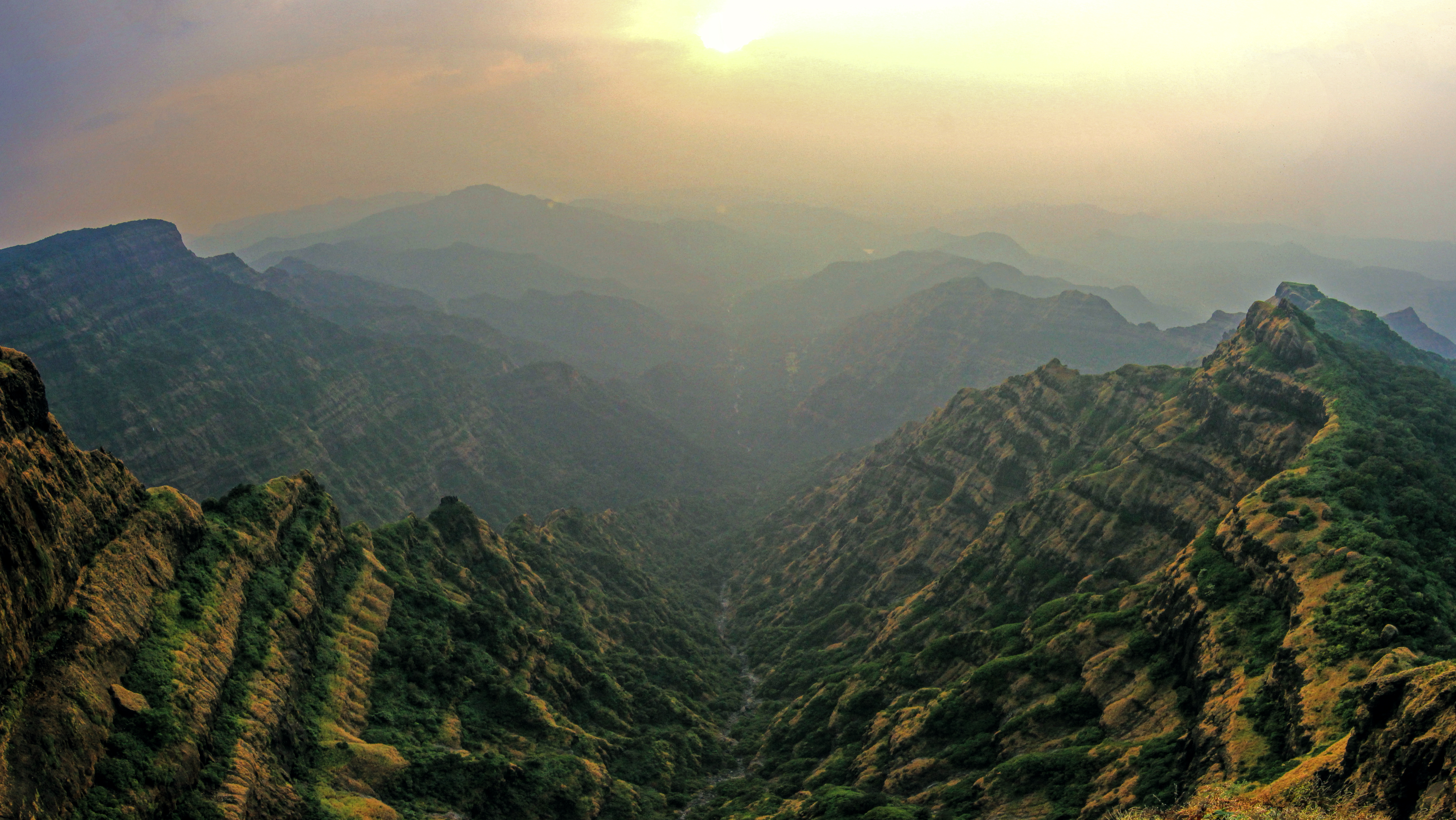
A view from Arthur seat point

=== Panchganga Temple ===
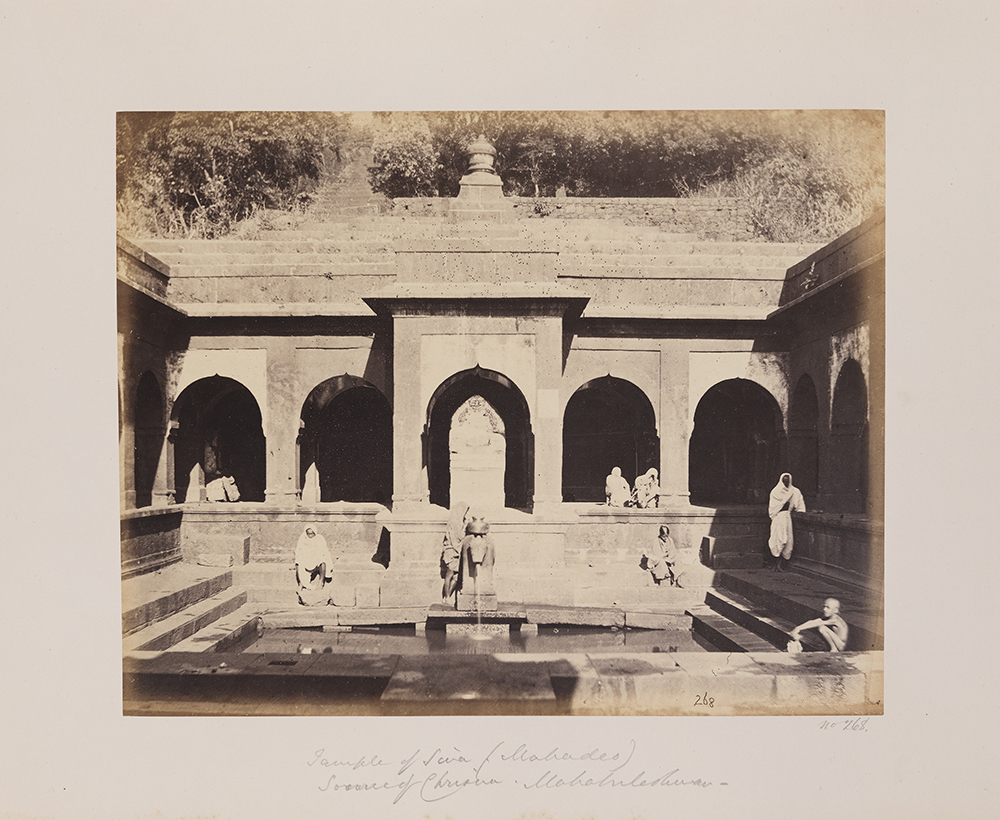
Old Panchganga temple circa 1850.

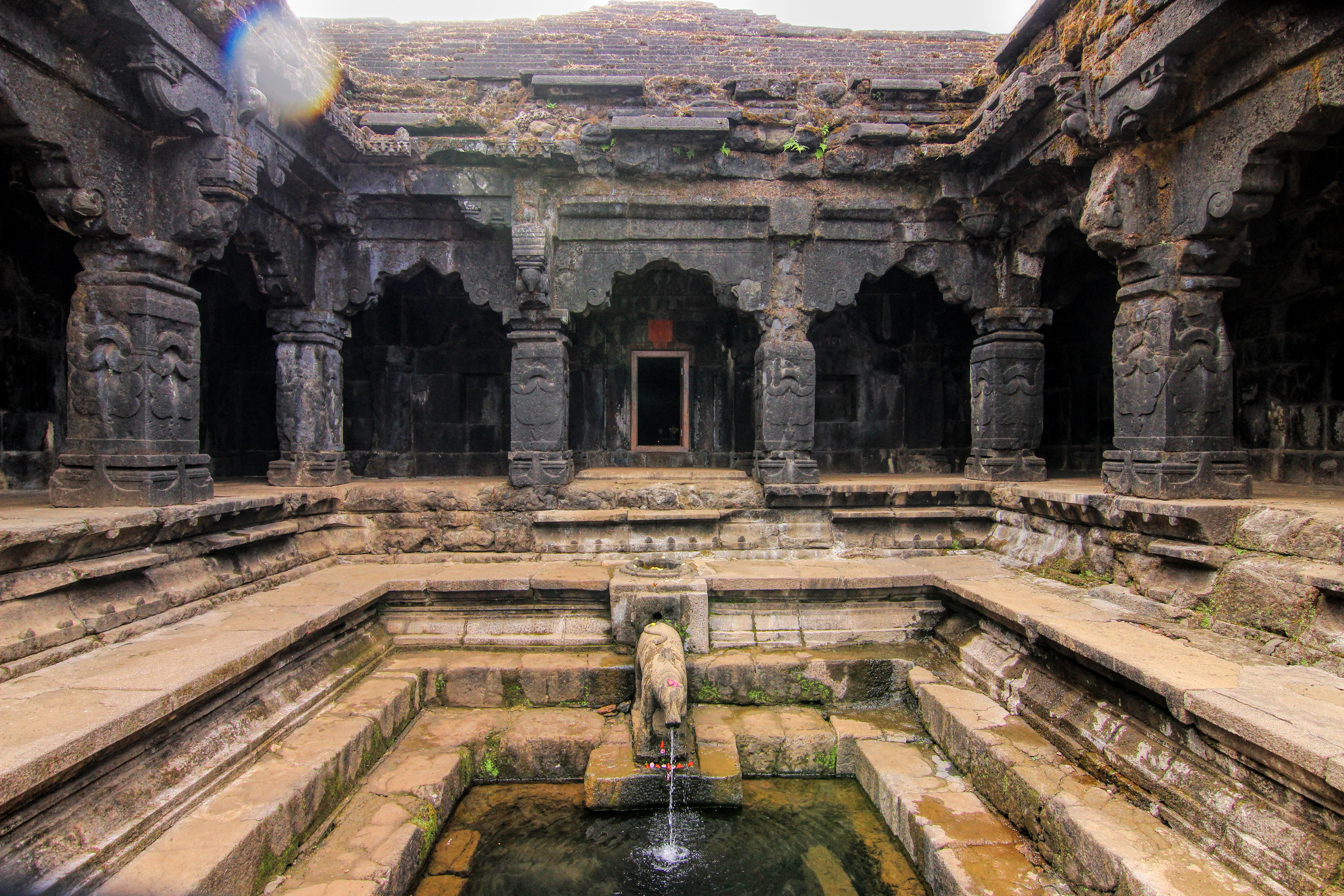
Krishnabai temple

The Panchganga temple is located at the convergence of five rivers; Krishna, Venna, Savitri, Koyna, and Gayatri. Panchganga translates to English as "Five Rivers", and this temple is the attributed source of those rivers.

The temple was constructed in the 13th century by the Seuna king Simhana. Renovation of the Panchganga Temple took place during the 16th and 17th centuries under "Chanda Rao More" and Chhatrapati Shivaji. Panchganga temple in Old Mahabaleshwar is said to be 4,500 years old. There is no historical evidence for this claim.

=== Krishnbai Temple ===
Krishnabai Temple, which is an old temple situated a few meters away from Panchganga temple in Old Mahabaleshwar. The temple is at a distance of 300 m from Mahabaleshwar temple and about 6 km from the Mahabaleshwar Bus Stand. It is one of the known tourist places in Mahabaleshwar. Krishnabai temple is supposed to be source of the Krishna River. The temple has a Shiva lingam along with a stunning statue of the Goddess Krishna.

== Demographics ==
126 families reside in Old Mahabaleshwar. The village has a population of 785, including 408 males and 377 females as stated by the 2011 population census. The average sex ratio of the village is 1.082, which is higher than the Maharashtra state average of 0.929. The literacy rate of the village was 96.89% compared to 82.34% of Maharashtra. In old Mahabaleshwar, the male literacy was 98.00% while the female literacy rate was 92.62%.
