= Awalan, Mahabaleshwar =

Village in Maharashtra

Awalan is a small village located in Mahabaleshwar taluka of Satara district.

== Demography ==
Awlan has total 48 families residing. The village has population of 173 of which 85 are males while 88 are females as per Population Census 2011. Average Sex Ratio of village is 1035 which is higher than Maharashtra state average of 929. Literacy rate of village was 62.89 % compared to 82.34 % of Maharashtra. In Awalan Male literacy stands at 80.00 % while female literacy rate was 47.62 %. Awalan has substantial population of Schedule Caste. Schedule Caste (SC) constitutes 29.48 % of total population in village. The village currently doesn't have any Schedule Tribe (ST) population.

== Geography ==
Awlan village is located at 17.54°N 73.91°E.[1] It has an average elevation of 560 metres (1200 ft) and .

Located about 150 km (95 mi) southwest of Pune and 340 km (210 mi) from Mumbai, Awalan is a vast plateau measuring 150 km2 (58 sq mi), bound by valleys on all sides. It reaches a height of 1,439 m (4,721 ft) at its highest peak above sea level, known as Uteshwar Temple

Awalan comprises four wadis: Manewadi, Khalchiwadi, Varchiwadi, and Baudhwadi.

== Culture ==
Village has temple of Bhairi Kumbalaj which was rebuilt in 2014. Awlan has people of various caste and religion, common surnames in Awlan are Sakpal, Shelar, Mane, More, Pawar and Kamble. As village is located beside Koyana river, it is also known as "Water village". In every Marathi month of Paush a cultural festival is organized in village which is based on local goddess.
