= Jenny Bhatt =

Indian-American writer

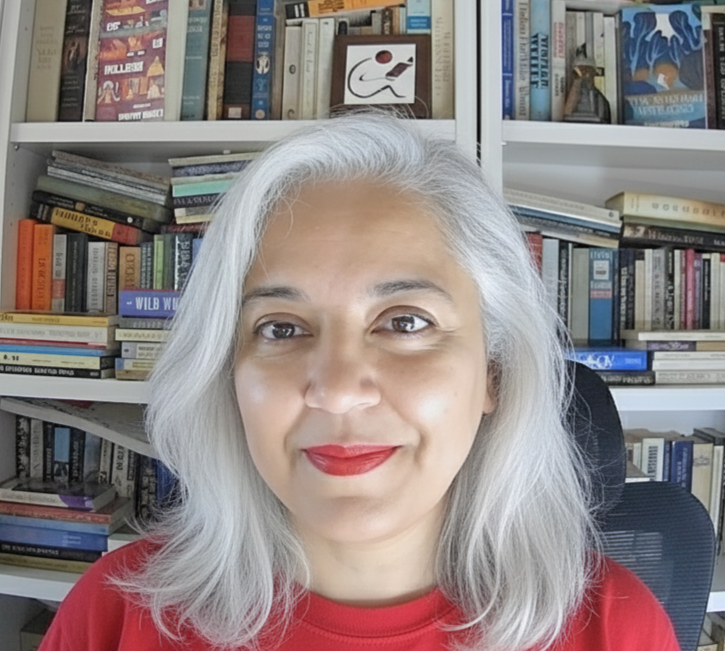
- Born: September 18, 1972 (age 53); Rajkot, Gujarat, India
- Education: Kimmins High School; University of Hertfordshire
- Occupations: Writer, translator, literary critic
- Website: jennybhattwriter.com

Jenny Bhatt (born September 18, 1972) is an Indian American writer, translator, and literary critic. She is the author of the story collection, Each of Us Killers, and the literary translation, Ratno Dholi: The Best Stories of Dhumketu, and The Shehnai Virtuoso and Other Stories by Dhumketu. She is the founder of Desi Books, a multimedia platform for South Asian literature. In 2025, she was awarded a National Endowment for the Arts (NEA) Translation Fellowship.

== Personal life ==
Bhatt was born in Rajkot, Gujarat, India, and grew up in Mumbai. She did most of her high school at Kimmins High School in Panchgani, Maharashtra. She attended the University of Hertfordshire in England as an engineering undergraduate. Thereafter, she worked in Germany, England, Scotland, and the United States at various multi-national corporations until 2012.

From 2012 to 2014, she worked as a personal financial advisor to people running small businesses.

Bhatt is based in the Dallas, Texas area. Bhatt is a doctoral student in the language and literature department at the University of Texas, Dallas.

== Writing ==
From 2016, Bhatt's short fiction has been published in various literary journals. Her non-fiction and literary criticism have been published by NPR, The Washington Post, Literary Hub, The Atlantic, and Publishers Weekly.

In 2022 Bhatt guest-edited a collection of Gujarati literature in translation works at Words Without Borders.

Bhatt's weekly newsletter, "We Are All Translators", has received mentions by Los Angeles Review of Books, Literary Hub, and The Dallas Morning News.

=== Short story collection ===
Bhatt's debut short story collection, Each of Us Killers, won the Foreword INDIES 2020 Book of the Year Short Stories award category and was a finalist in the Multicultural Adult Fiction category. It was cited as one of the most anticipated debuts of the second half of 2020 by Electric Literature, Literary Hub, The Millions, and Entropy Magazine. Published by 7.13 Books, the story collection received a starred review from Shelf Awareness, saying “[c]hallenging assumptions, confronting power, manipulating barriers whenever possible–even at grave personal cost–Bhatt’s cast surprises, inspires, frightens, beguiles, but never disappoints.” Publishers Weekly wrote that Bhatt's "stories are memorable on their own, and they add up to a powerful expression of the hunger for success on one's own terms." Kirkus Reviews called it a "formally diverse collection with exquisitely crafted stories about longing, striving, and learning what we can control" and listed it as one of the must-read collections of fall 2020. Bustle listed it as a must-read book of September 2020 and as one of the best collections of 2020. Largehearted Boy listed it as a favorite short story collection of 2020. Book Riot listed it as one of the top ten short story collections of 2020 by Asian authors. Tabish Khair, writing for The Hindu, described the work saying, "Bhatt gets under the skin of her characters with an ease that is difficult to achieve when creating characters beyond the pale of capital and caste ... using lively, sculpted language that avoids the stilted, literary English often afflicting Indian English writing."

=== Anthologies ===
Bhatt's story 'Return to India' was included in The Best American Mystery and Suspense 2021, selected by Alafair Burke and series editor, Steph Cha. In her introduction, Burke wrote: "In “Return to India”, Jenny Bhatt uses the structure of witness statements to build a tightly woven mystery, while effortlessly balancing a broad cast of diverse characters and voices as they collectively narrate the painful series of facts leading to a crime of violence."

In 2023, the crime/noir forward anthology, The Dark Waves of Winter, edited by David M. Olsen, included a short story by Bhatt titled 'Lili's Song'. IndieReader called the anthology "a first-rate anthology for literary short story fans with consistently excellent writing throughout." Also in 2023, Bhatt's short story, 'The Weight of His Bones' was included in South to South: Writing South Asia in the American South, an anthology edited by Khem K. Aryal.

== Translation ==
Ratno Dholi: The Best Stories of Dhumketu is a translation of 26 short stories by the Gujarati writer, Dhumketu that was published by HarperCollins India in October 2020. It was shortlisted for the Valley of Words Book Award in the 'English Translations From Regional Languages' category, The Hindustan Times praised the translation as "reasonably fast-paced and eminently accessible." Womensweb.in said that "Jenny Bhatt’s translation is nuanced but simple, and does justice to these stories.” Firstpost wrote that "Her translations make for a crisp and honest rendering of 20th century Gujarat." The Deccan Chronicle praised the depth of each story, adding: “which means that a) the translator has done an excellent job and b) every story in the book is satisfying, something that does not often happen with short story collections.”

In 2022, the US edition of Bhatt's literary translation of Dhumketu's selected short stories was published as The Shehnai Virtuoso and Other Stories by Deep Vellum Books. Kirkus Reviews called it "a love letter to the power of art and the human spirit." Words Without Borders reviewed it as a "skillful translation." The translation also made World Literature Today's 75 Notable Translations of 2022 list. In an interview with Five Books, Bhatt said that "Not only is it the first ever book-length translation of his vast oeuvre, it is also the first ever translation from Gujarati being published in the US, where we have the largest Gujarati diaspora."

In 2025, Bhatt was awarded a National Endowment for the Arts (NEA) Translation Fellowship.

== Podcast ==
Bhatt started Desi Books as a podcast in April 2020 to spotlight books by writers of South Asian origin. Mid-Day called it a venue for "the best of desi reads." Eastern Eye described it as one of the most "popular podcasts redefining real talk." The Los Angeles Review of Books described it, "What started as a modest program now has several channels, featuring conversations on craft, book reviews, and even video episodes."

In August 2021, Desi Books was registered as an LLC and multimedia forum that showcases South Asian literature and connects readers and writers through conversation and community. In February 2023, Bhatt announced that she would be winding down the platform although the archives would remain online.
