= Mahabaleshwar strawberry =

Edible fruit cultivar

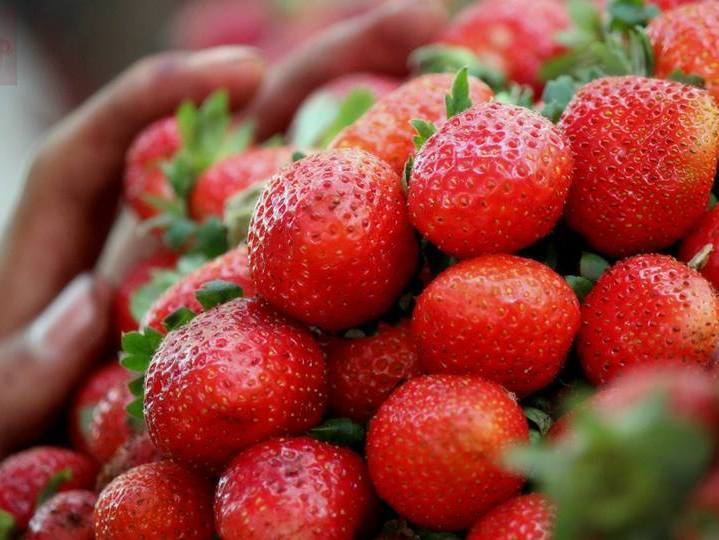
Mahabaleshwar strawberries

The Mahabaleshwar strawberry is a strawberry grown in the hilly slopes of Mahabaleshwar, India which accounts for about 85 percent of the total strawberry produced in that country. Strawberries, along with raspberries, mulberries and gooseberries are produced on a large scale in and around Mahabaleshwar. The Mahabaleshwar strawberry obtained the geographical indication (GI) tag in 2010.

== History ==
Strawberries were brought to the region from Australia during the British colonial rule. Mahabaleshwar was the summer capital of the Bombay Presidency under British Raj. Since then, local farmers have developed their own varieties of the fruit, some of which are imported from other places.

== Production ==
The Mahabaleshwar strawberry is grown mainly in the hilly Mahabaleshwar-Panchgani belt in western Maharashtra. As of late 2015, it is grown in an estimated area of 3,000 acres with about 30,000 metric tonnes of the fruit being produced annually. Mahabaleshwar strawberry contributes to about 85 percent of the total strawberry production in the country. The cool climate and red soil of the region make it suitable for growing the fruit and give it a unique taste.

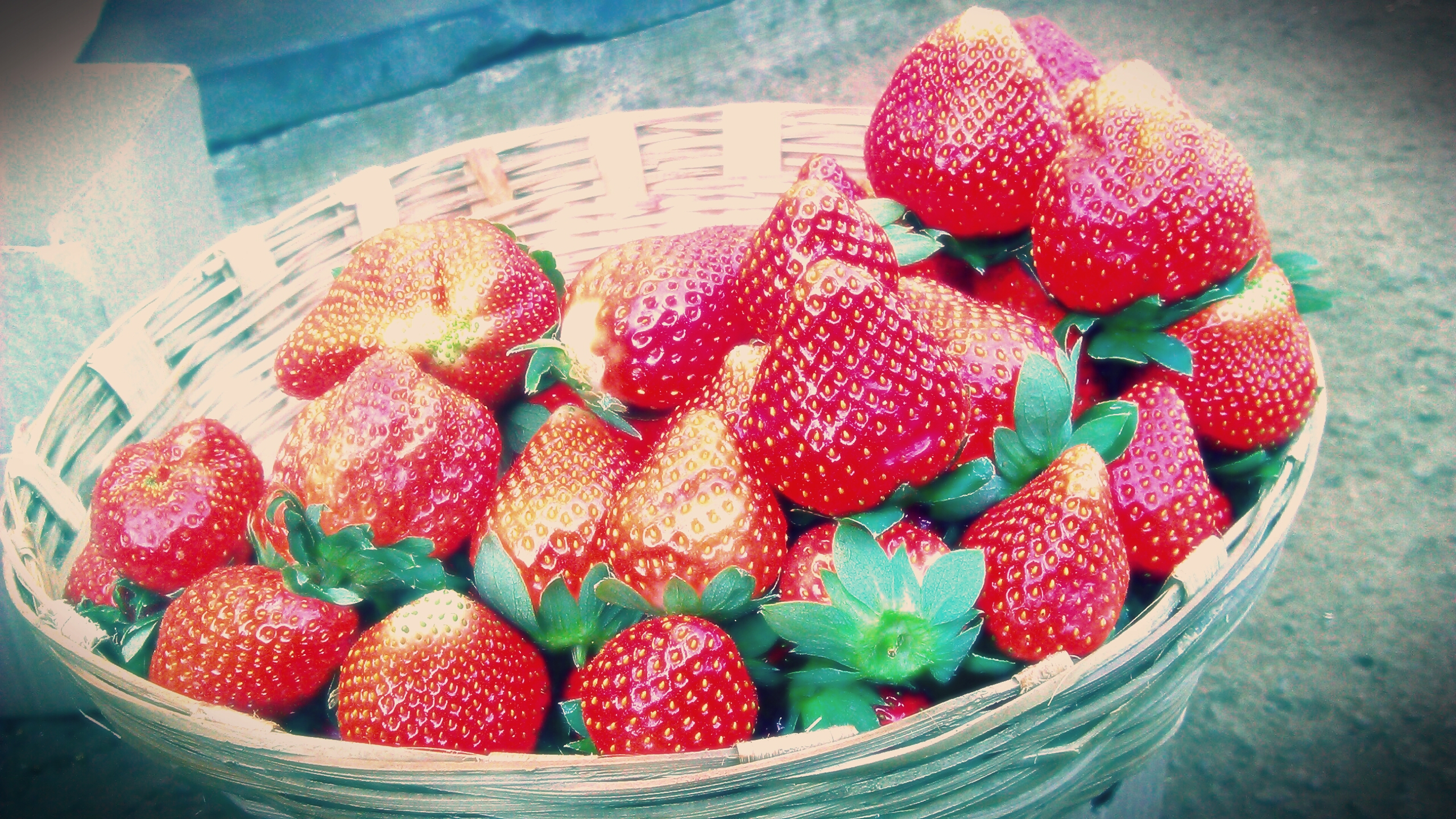
Mahabaleshwar strawberries being sold

The Mahabaleshwar strawberry is a seasonal fruit with the usual season lasting between October–November and April–May. Mother saplings, some of which are imported from California in the month of June, are planted in nurseries in places like Wai. The runners produced by each of these saplings are replanted in the month of September. The land is prepared after the monsoon season in September by fumigation and covering the fields with plastic sheets. The seeds are planted in holes punched through these sheets and sprays are added to the fields.

Nearly half of the fruit in the region belongs to the Sweet Charlie variety of California, with Camarosa and Winter Dawn being the other two major varieties. Other notable varieties include Rania and Nabila. Mahabaleshwar strawberry is used in making various food products in the region such as preserves, jams, fruit crushes, ice-creams, milkshakes, strawberry with fresh cream, strawberry fudge, strawberry wine and jelly toffees.

== Export ==
Strawberries from Mahabaleshwar are exported in large quantities to other countries like France, Belgium, Malaysia, and to the Middle East. The fruit is frozen before it is exported.

== Geographical Indication ==
In 2009, the All India Strawberry Grower's Association proposed the registration of Mahabaleshwar strawberry under the Geographical Indications of Goods Act, 1999, to the Office of the Controller-General of Patents, Designs and Trademarks, Chennai. The fruit was granted the GI status two years later in 2010.

== See also ==
- Mapro Garden
- List of Geographical Indications in India
- List of strawberry cultivars
