= Kimmins High School =

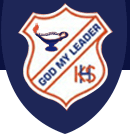

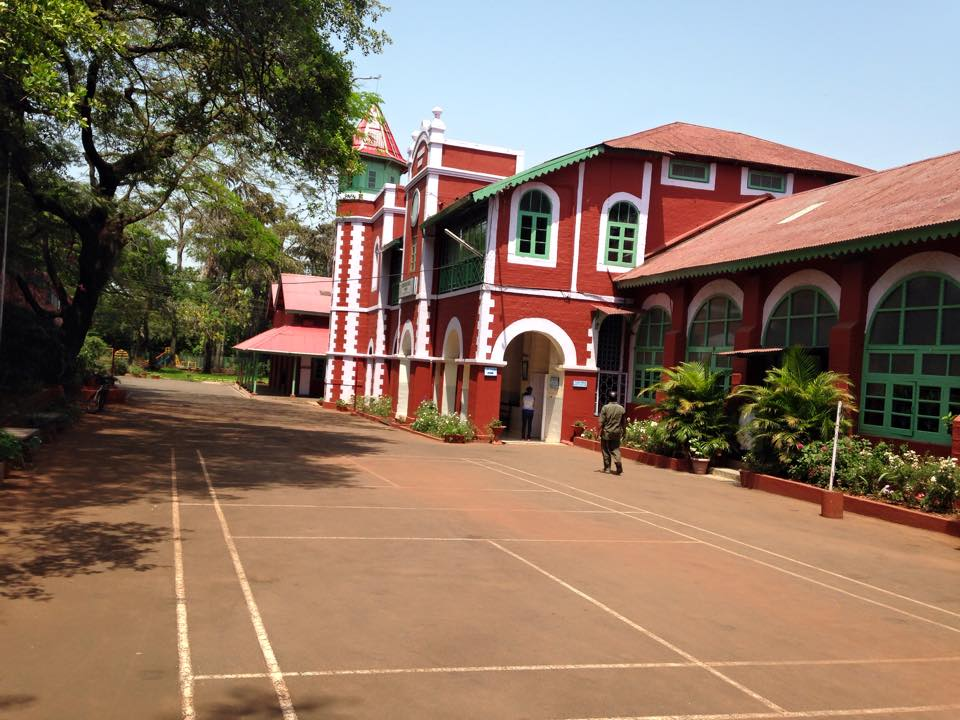
- Kimmins High School
- Panchgani, Maharashtra; India

Information
- Type: Boarding secondary school
- Motto: God, My Leader
- Established: 1898; 128 years ago
- Founder: Alice Emilie Kimmin
- Sister school: Queen Mary School, Mumbai
- Gender: Girls
- Website: kimminsschool.edu.in

Kimmins High School is a girls' boarding school in Panchgani in the state of Maharashtra, India, founded in 1898. It was founded as the "sister" school of Queen Mary School, Mumbai, providing boarding school capability for girls who could not attend Queen Mary's as day students.

== Notable alumni ==
- Protima Bedi - dancer
- Jenny Bhatt - author
