= Savitri River =

Coordinates: 17°58′N 73°02′E

Savitri
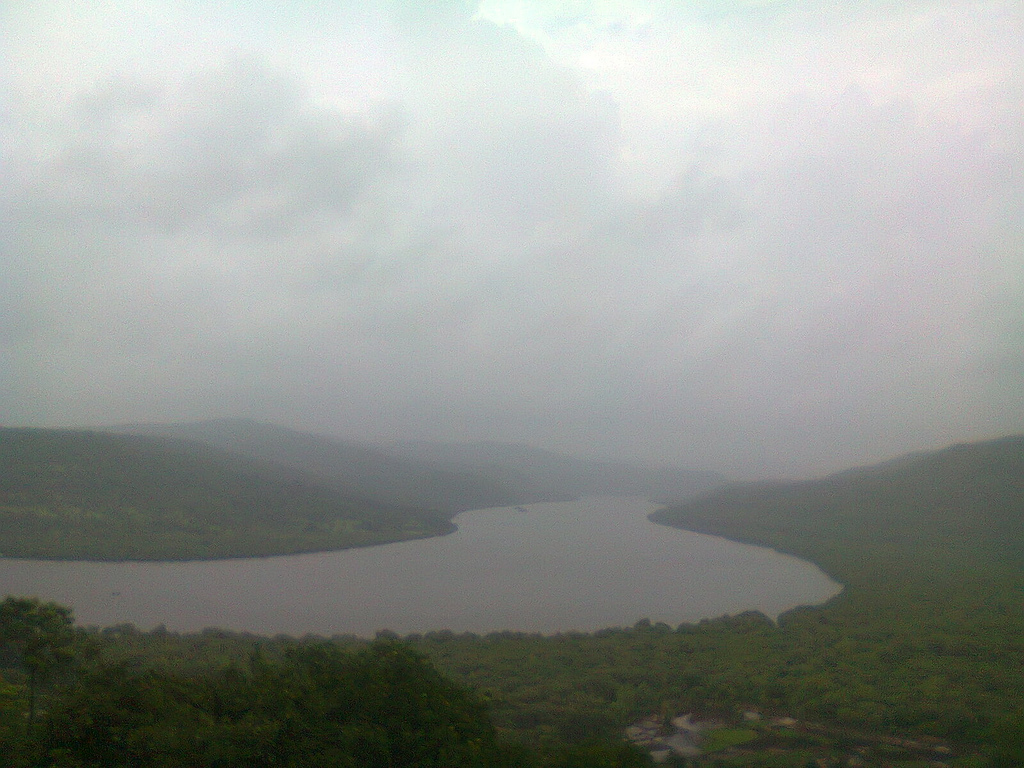
- Savitri River in Konkan

Location
- Country: India
- State: Maharashtra

Physical characteristics
- Source: Savitri Point, Mahabaleshwar
- Mouth
  - location: Bankot creek, Near Harihareshwar, Konkan, Arabian Sea
- Length: Around 110 km (68 mi)

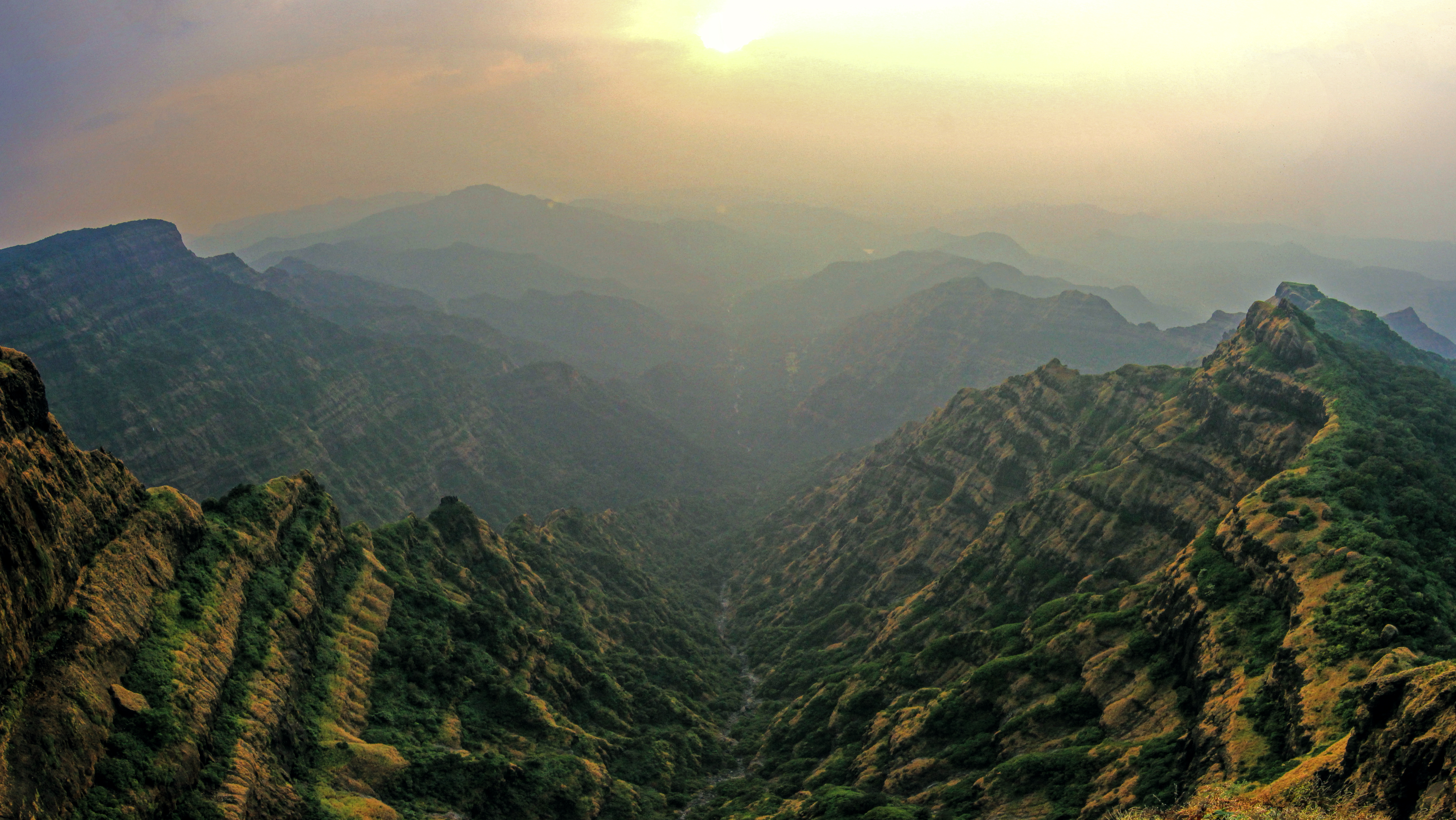
Savitri river and adjoining valley as seen from top of Mahabaleshwar hill

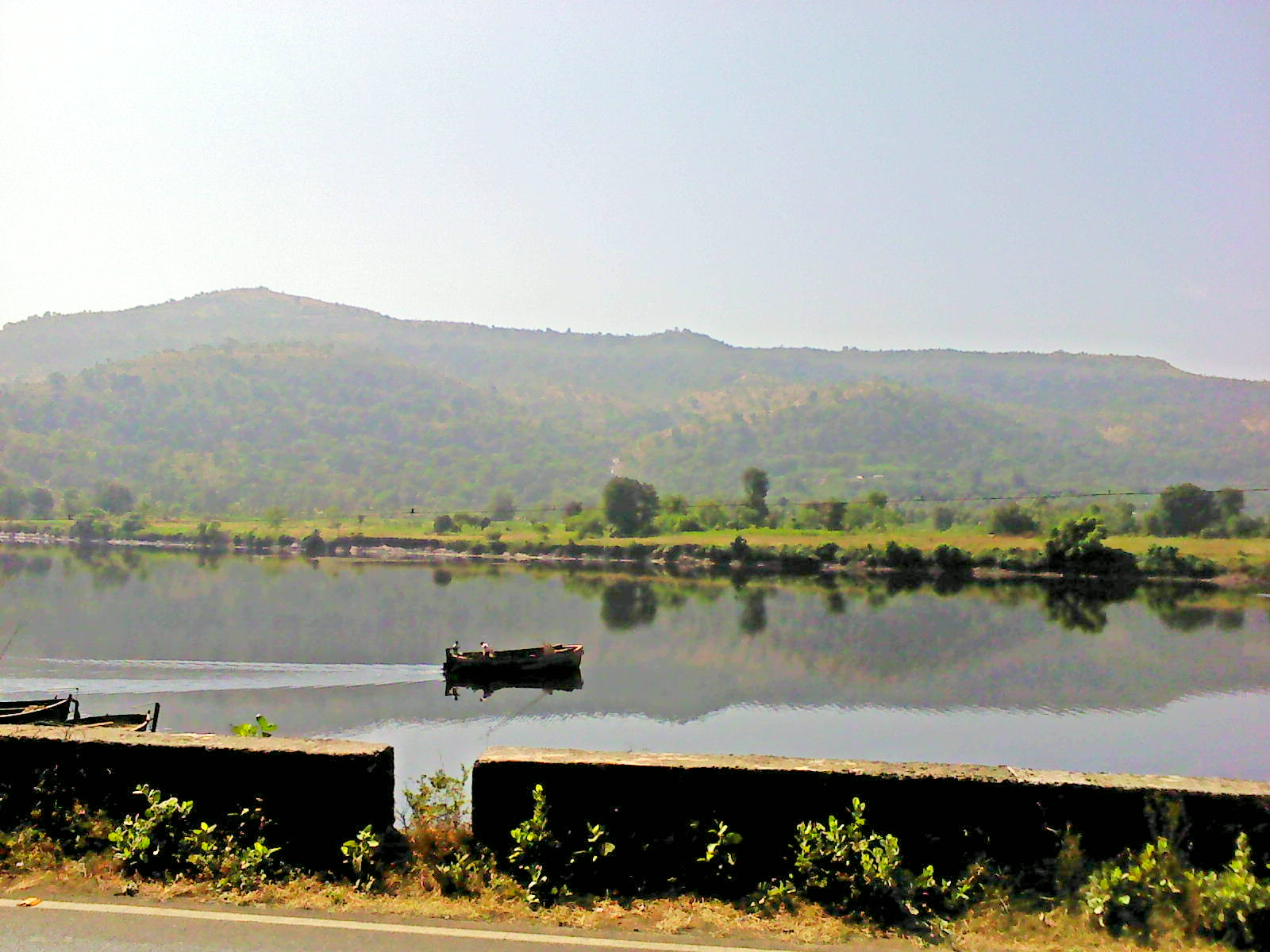
Savitri river near Mahad

Savitri River is one of the five rivers which originate from Mahabaleshwar in Maharashtra state in India. It originates at Savitri point near Mahabaleshwar and flows through the Bankot village and directly goes to the Arabian Sea Raigad district and eventually meets Arabian Sea at Harehareshwar. It passes through rocky and hilly terrain of Western Ghats till Poladpur and further through the towns of Mahad, Mangaon and Shrivardhan Tehsil (taluka). There are a number of Shiva temples along the banks of river Savitri. Many other small rivers get merged into it at Kapade, Poladpur and Birwadi. Its major tributary is the Kal River which enters from the right (north) near Dasgaon.

More than 24 people were reported missing, on 3 August 2016, when a British era bridge collapsed due to heavy rains near Raigad district. Two state transport buses and several vehicles reportedly plunged into the river.

The other four rivers originating from Mahabaleshwar (Panchganga) are: Gayatri River, Koyna River, Krishna River, and Venna River.
