= Venna River =

Coordinates: 17°18′N 74°10′E

Venna

Location
- Country: India
- State: Maharashtra
- District: Satara District

Physical characteristics
- Source: Venna Lake
  - location: Mahabaleshwar
- Mouth: Krishna River
  - location: Sangam Mahuli, Satara
- Length: 122 km (76 mi)

Basin features
- River system: Krishna River

The Venna River rises in Mahabaleshwar, and is a tributary of the Krishna River in Satara district of western Maharashtra, India. It rises near Mahableshwar, a famous hill station in the Western Ghats. The Venna's confluence with the Krishna River takes place at Sangam Mahuli which is located in eastern part of Satara city. The River Krishna is one of the three largest rivers in India.

== See also ==
Other four rivers originating from Mahabaleshwar (Panchganga):

- Gayatri River
- Koyna River
- Krishna River
- Savitri River
