= Mapro Garden =

Garden park in Maharashtra, India

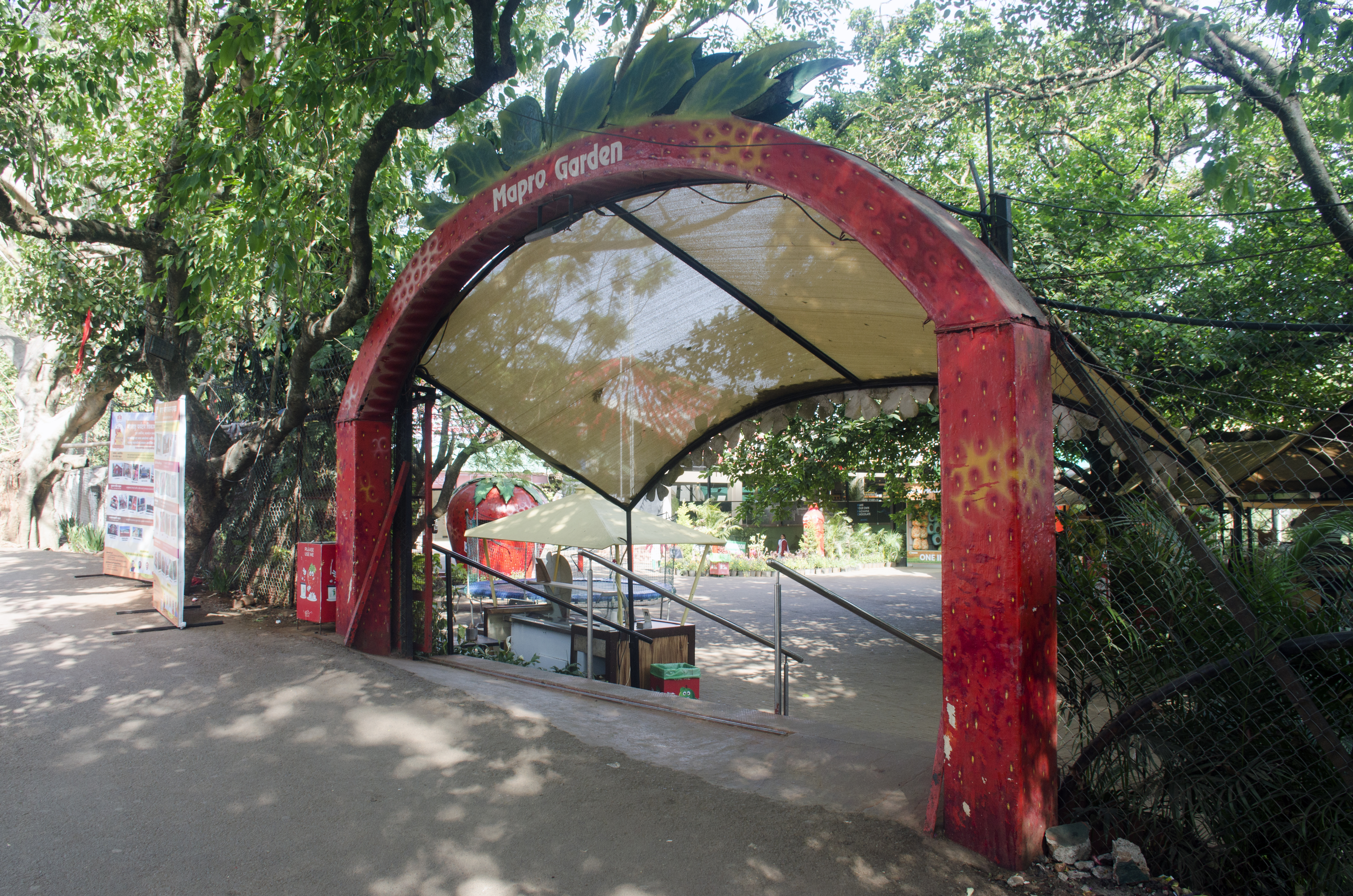
Gate of Mapro Garden

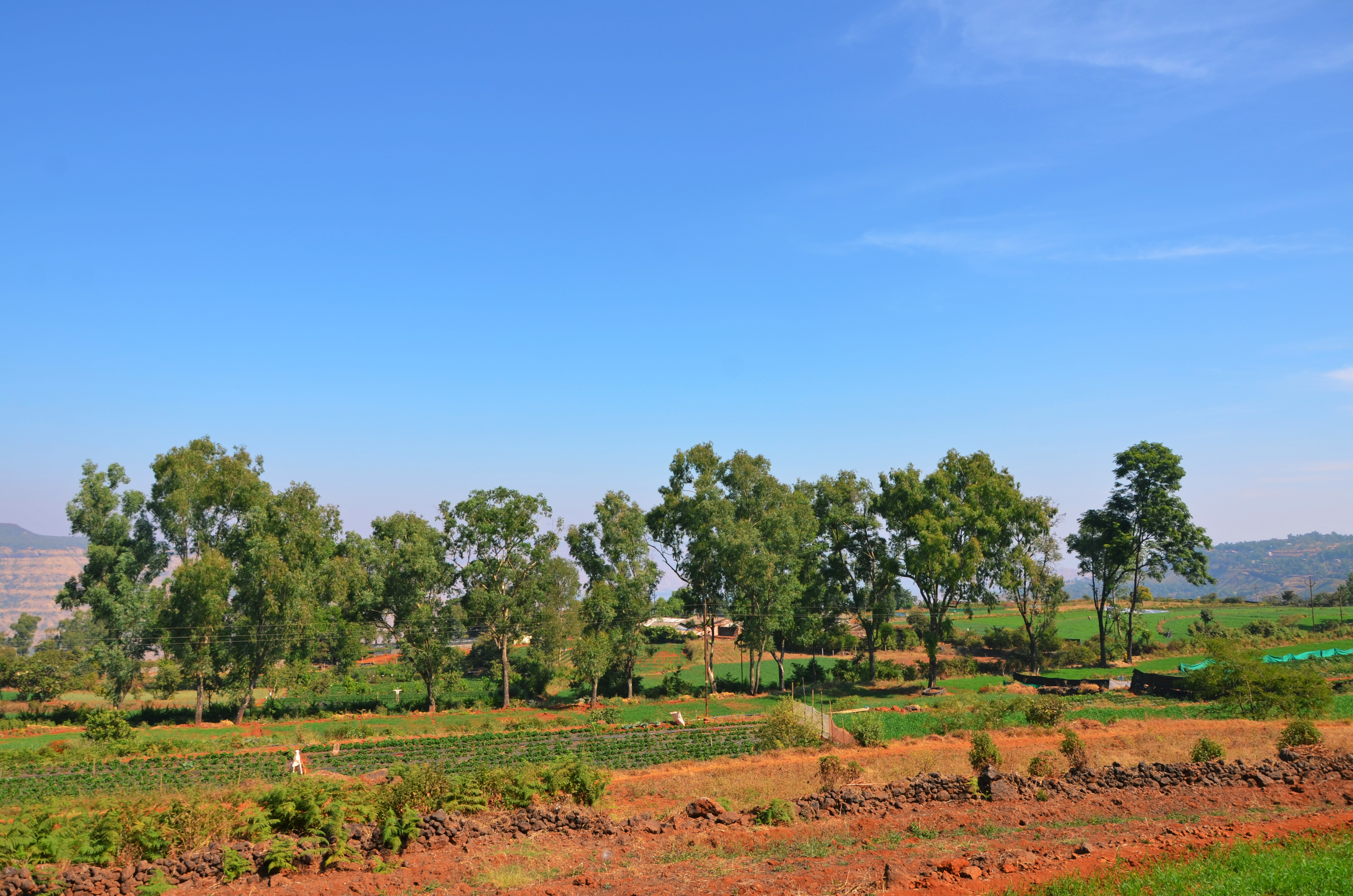
Strawberry farming at Mapro Garden, Panchgani

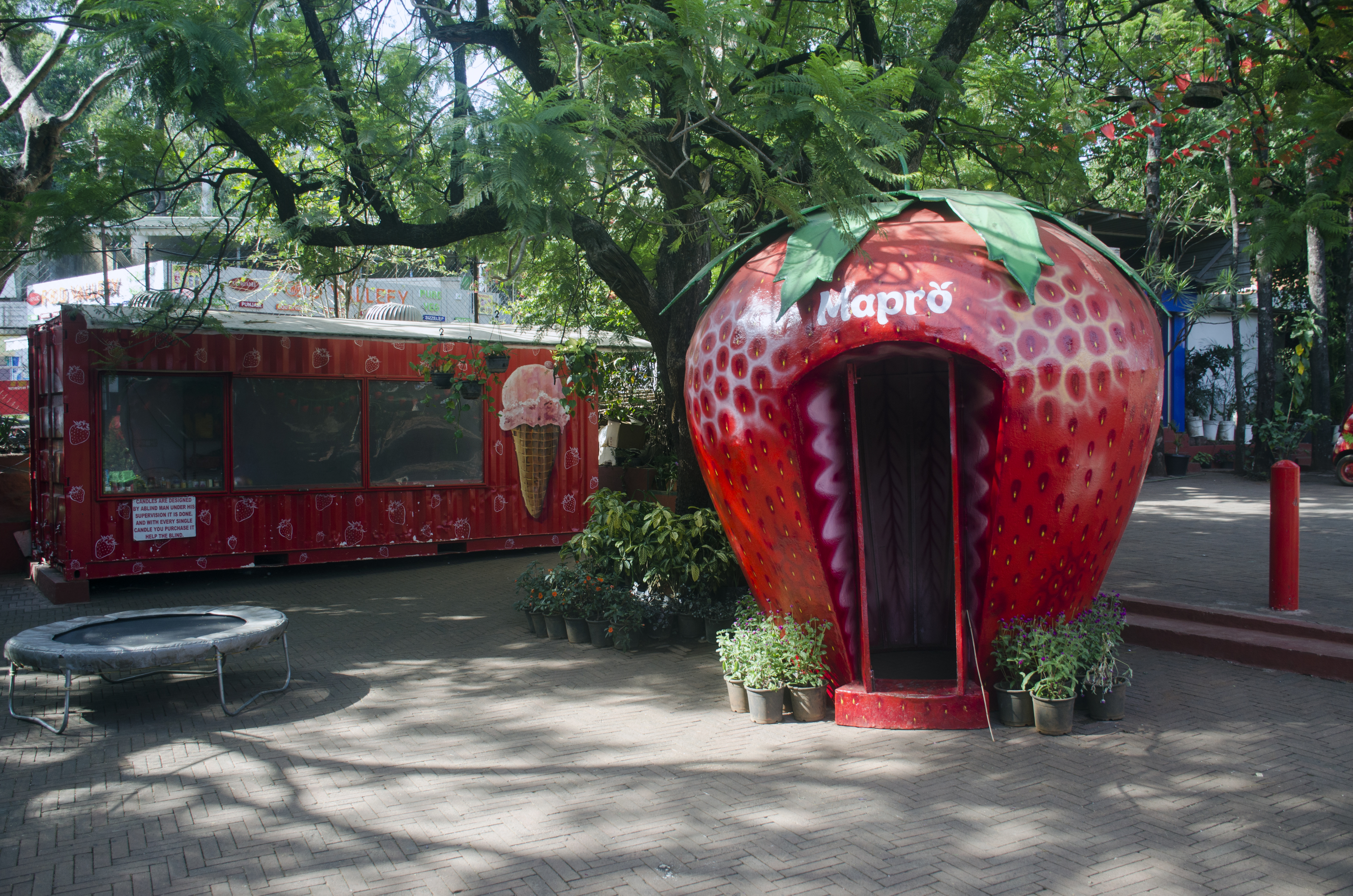
Inside Mapro Garden

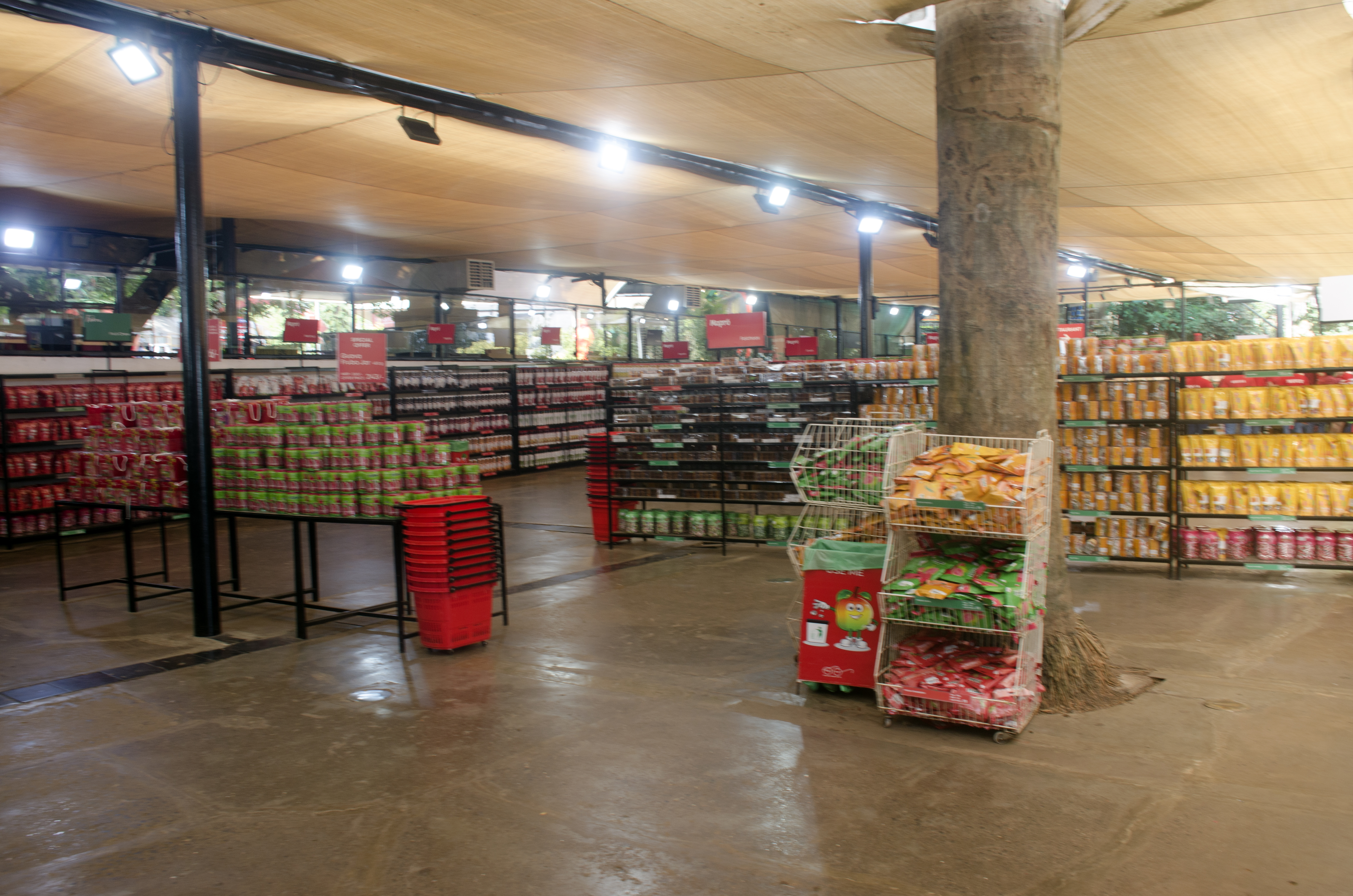
Shop at Mapro Garden

Mapro Gardens is a garden park in the hill station of Panchgani, in the Indian state of Maharashtra. It is near to Mahabaleshwar. The region is India's leading strawberry producer. It is a popular tourist destination. It is located in the village of Gureghar and developed and maintained by food processing company Mapro. Gureghar claims to be one of India's first villages to have 100% sanitation with every house having a biogas plant.

== Produce ==
Mahabaleshwar contributes 85% of India's total strawberry output. About 80% is consumed fresh.

== History ==
Mapro is a food processing company founded in 1959, in the hill-town of Panchgani, near Mahabaleswar. Mapro was started by pharmacist Kishore Vora. From 1983 it was expanded by his nephew Mayur Vora.

Mapro set up a fruit processing unit at Gureghar with 12 employees. Mapro provided nearby farmers with technical guidance and committed to buy their produce.

Tourist recognition led to the development of the Mapro Garden which defines the identity of Gureghar among tourists.

The rise of modern retail gave Mapro a nationwide network. After tax reforms Mapro invested in setting up three new units in Satara and Pune districts in Maharashtra and Pathankot in Punjab. As of 2012, installed capacity was 100 tonnes/day. As growth in the jam and squash businesses started slowing in 2005, Mapro entered the confectionery and chocolate industry.

== Festival ==
Gureghar/Mapro Garden hosts an annual Strawberry Festival. The festival encourages strawberry cultivation in the area. During the festival fresh picked strawberries are lined up for visitors. Traditional folk performances such as Shivkalin Dhol and Lezim take place.

== Location ==
Mapro Garden - Gureghar Mahabaleshwar

Mapro Garden Heritage - Gureghar Mahabaleshwar

Mapro Food Park - Shendurjane Wai

Mapro Garden - Valvan Lonavala
