= St. Joseph's Convent School, Panchgani =

School in Maharashtra, India

St. Joseph's Convent School, Panchgani is an all-girls Catholic boarding school in Panchgani, Maharashtra.

== History ==
After 1857, the British were consolidating their hold on their Indian Empire. The hill stations were developed and Panchgani's bracing climate made it a popular health resort and an educational centre. St. Joseph’s Convent School was founded in October 1895 under the patronage of the Bishop of Poona and the Roman Catholic order of nuns, known as the Daughters of the Cross, making it one of the oldest existing schools in Panchgani.

As of 1910, the school had 40 students.

== Academics ==
10th grade students take the Indian Certificate of Secondary Education examination.

The subjects that are offered are divided into three groups. Group I includes Compulsory Subjects - English, History, Civics & Geography, and Indian Language, Group II which includes any two from Mathematics, Science, Environmental Science, Computer Science, Agricultural Science, Commercial Studies, Technical Drawing, A Modern Foreign Language, A Classical Language and Economics, and Group III has any one from Computer Applications, Economic Applications, Commercial Applications, Art, Performing Arts, Home Science, Cookery, Fashion Designing, Physical Education, Technical Drawing Applications, Yoga, and Environmental Applications. All subjects have components of internal assessment, that are carried out by schools, on the basis of assignments/project work, practicals and coursework. There is 20% weightage for internal assessment in group I and II and 50% weightage for group III.

== Notable alumni ==
- Nutan - Indian Film Actress
- Kajol - Indian Film Actress
- Zeenat Aman - Indian Film Actress
- Reita Faria - Miss World 1966
- Prachi Desai - Indian Film Actress
- Kim Sharma - Indian Film Actress
- Protima Bedi - Model and Classical Dancer
