= Venna Lake =

Lake in India

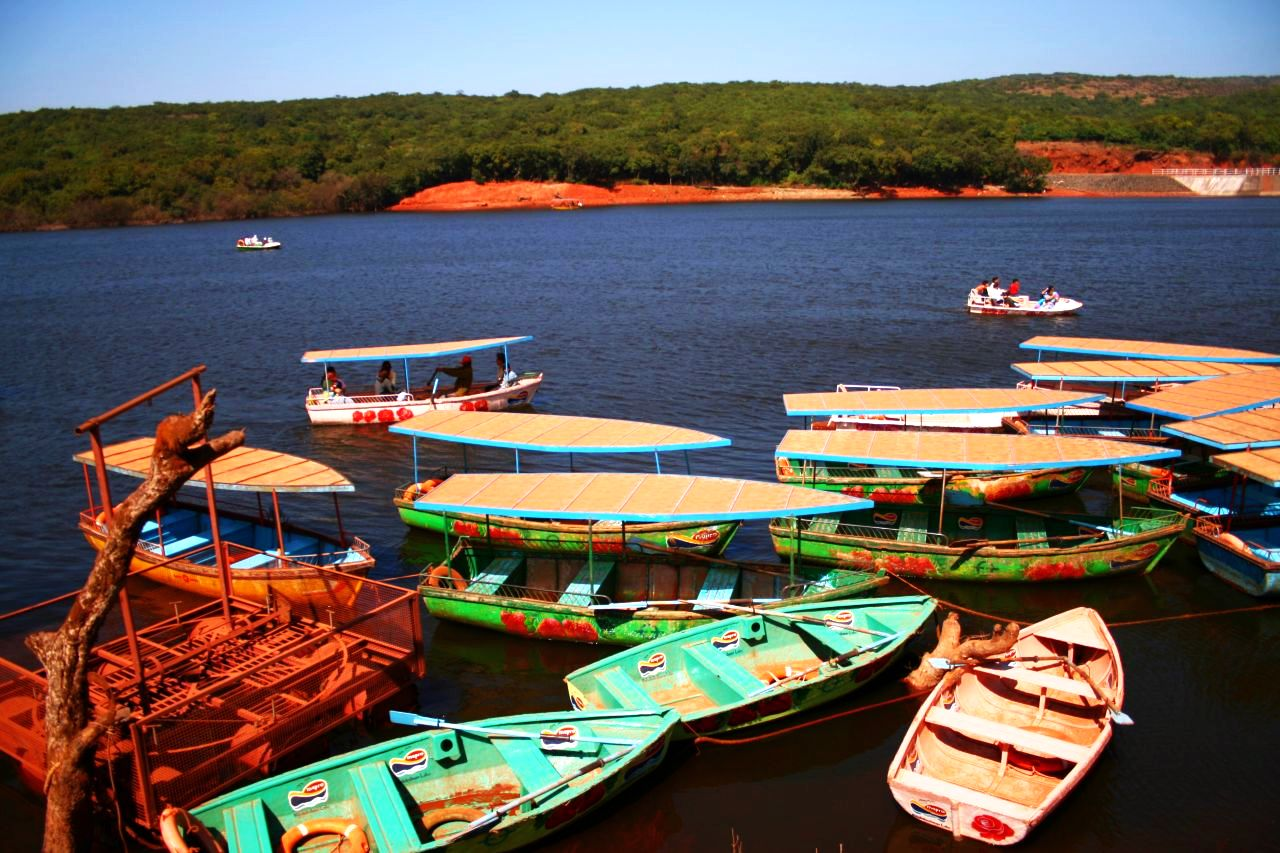
- Boats on Venna Lake

- Location within Maharashtra
- Location: Mahabaleshwar, Maharashtra
- Coordinates: 17.934°N 73.665°E
- Basin countries: India
- Max. length: 4 km (2.5 mi)
- Max. width: 1.5 km (0.93 mi)
- Average depth: 80 ft (24 m)
- Max. depth: 120 ft (37 m) (Center)

Venna Lake is one of the tourist attractions of Mahabaleshwar in Maharashtra state in India. The lake was constructed in 1842 by Shahaji, the last raja (king) of the Satara princely state. The lake is surrounded by trees. Tourists can enjoy a boat ride over the lake or a horse ride next to the lake. A number of small eateries line the banks of the lake. The Mahabaleshwar city market and the S.T. bus stand is about 2 km (1.2 mi) from the lake.
