= Dasgaon =

Village in Maharashtra

Dasgaon is a village in Raigad District in Maharashtra, India. There is a historical place Daulatagad on the mountain or in the village.
