= Mahabaleshwar =

Town in Maharashtra, India

- Hill station
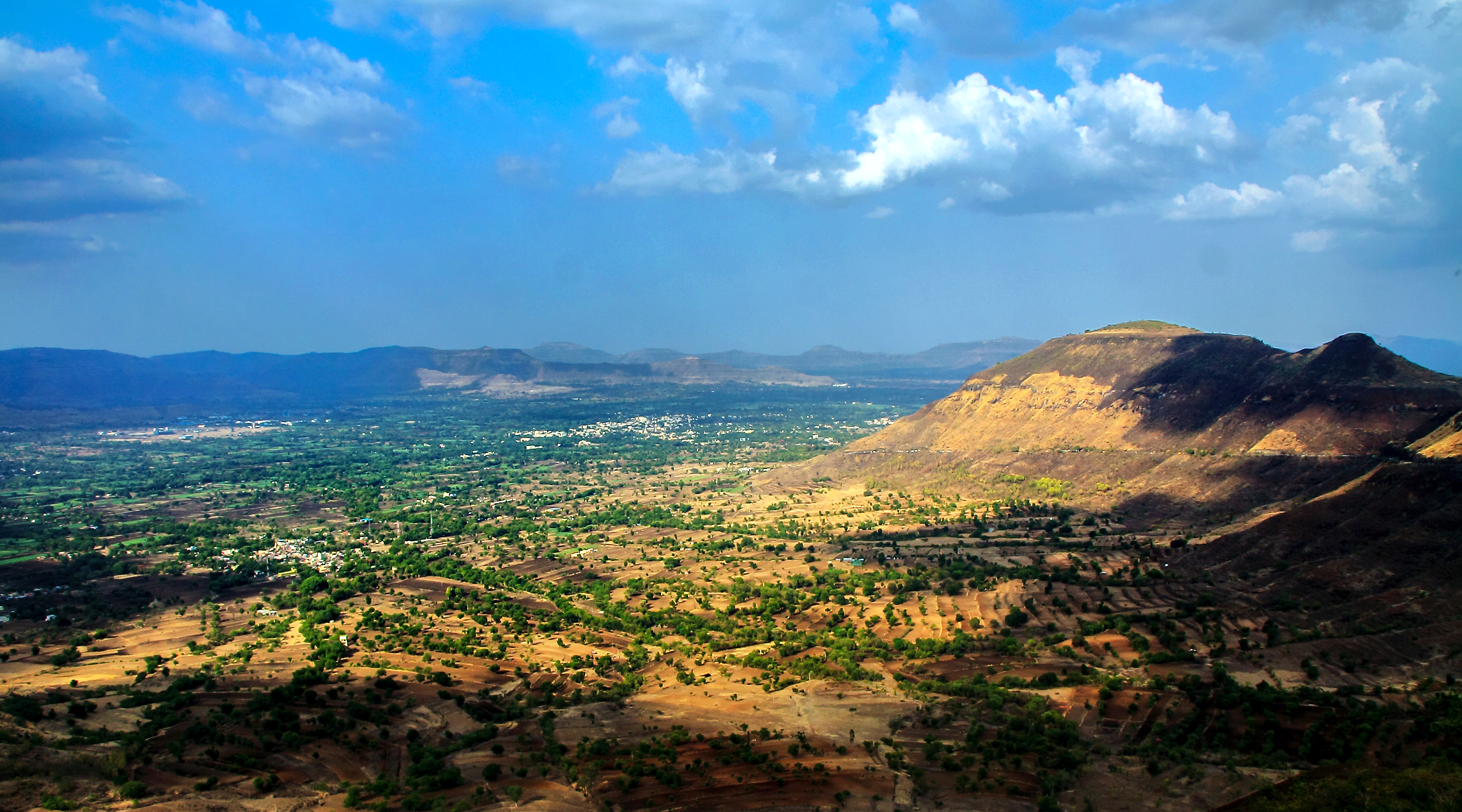

- Location within Maharashtra Location within India
- Coordinates: 17.9250°N 73.6575°E
- Country: India
- State: Maharashtra
- District: Satara District

Area
  - Total: 137.15 km^{2} (52.95 sq mi)
- Elevation: 1,353 m (4,439 ft)

Population (2011)
  - Total: 12,737
  - Density: 92.869/km^{2} (240.53/sq mi)

Languages
  - Official: Marathi
- Time zone: UTC+5:30 (IST)
- Sex ratio: 90 females/ 100 males ♀/♂
- Literacy Rate: 78%

Mahabaleshwar is a small town and a municipal council in Satara district, Maharashtra, India. It is a place of pilgrimage because the Krishna River, which considered sacred by Hindus, has its origin here along with five of its tributaries. The British colonial rulers developed the town as a hill station, and it served as the summer capital of the Bombay Presidency during the colonial rule.

== Geography ==
Mahabaleshwar is located on the mountainous Sahyadri range of the Western Ghats that run north to south along the western coast of India. The coordinates of the town are 17.9250°N 73.6575°E. Mahabaleshwar is a vast plateau measuring 150 km^{2} (58 sq mi), bound by valleys on all sides. It reaches a height of 1,439 m (4,721 ft) at its highest peak above sea level, known as Wilson/Sunrise Point. The town is about 122 km (76 mi) southwest of Pune and 285 km (177 mi) from Mumbai.

Mahabaleshwar comprises three villages: Malcolm Peth, Old "Kshetra" Mahabaleshwar, and part of the Shindola village. The Mahabaleshwar region is the source of the Krishna River, that flows east across Maharashtra, Karnataka, Telangana, and Andhra Pradesh towards the Bay of Bengal. Three tributaries of Krishna, namely Koyna, Venna (Veni), and Gayatri, also have their source in Mahabaleshwar region. A fourth river, the Savitri, also has its source in the region, but flows Westward via Mahad, to the Arabian Sea.

The area's climate is suitable for the cultivation of strawberries; Mahabaleshwar strawberry contributes to about 85 percent of the total strawberry production in the country. It also received the Geographical Indication (GI) tag in 2010.

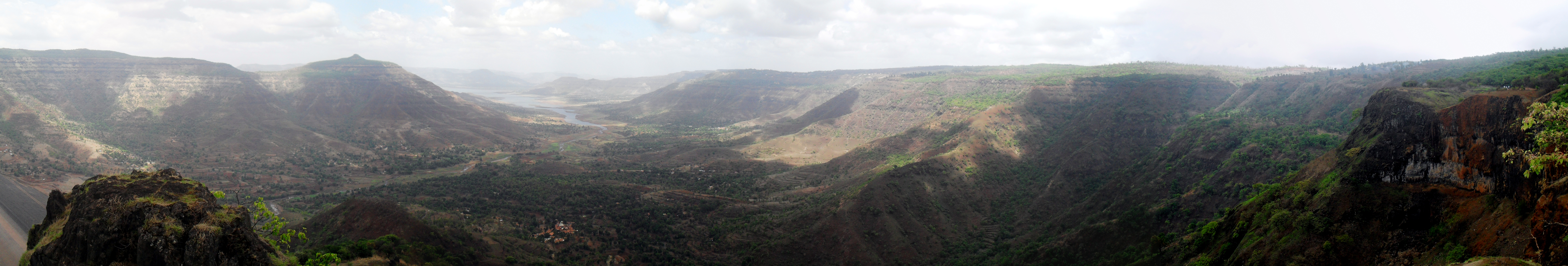
Panoramic view of Mahabaleshwar

=== Climate ===
Mahabaleshwar has a borderline tropical monsoon/humid subtropical climate (Köppen Am/Cwa). Very heavy rainfall is a normal occurrence during the monsoons. During July, 10–12 days of continuous rains, with 100 to 200 mm or 4 to 8 in each day, occur each year. There were reports of ice and ground frost formation around Venna Lake in 2018. On August 7, 2019, Mahabaleshwar recorded 330 mm or 12.99 in of rain in 24 hours, causing landslides. Mahabaleshwar has been described as the "New Candidate for the wettest place in the world", the title currently held by Cherrapunji.

Climate data for Mahabaleshwar (1991–2020, extremes 1932–2020). Mahabaleshwar's monsoon season is colder than its summer and winter.
| Month | Jan | Feb | Mar | Apr | May | Jun | Jul | Aug | Sep | Oct | Nov | Dec | Year |
|---|---|---|---|---|---|---|---|---|---|---|---|---|---|
| Record high °C (°F) | 32.4 (90.3) | 33.9 (93.0) | 35.9 (96.6) | 37.6 (99.7) | 37.4 (99.3) | 34.8 (94.6) | 31.7 (89.1) | 29.6 (85.3) | 29.2 (84.6) | 31.9 (89.4) | 32.0 (89.6) | 31.0 (87.8) | 37.6 (99.7) |
| Mean daily maximum °C (°F) | 26.4 (79.5) | 28.1 (82.6) | 31.0 (87.8) | 32.1 (89.8) | 30.5 (86.9) | 23.8 (74.8) | 20.1 (68.2) | 19.7 (67.5) | 21.8 (71.2) | 25.8 (78.4) | 25.9 (78.6) | 26.1 (79.0) | 26.0 (78.8) |
| Mean daily minimum °C (°F) | 13.4 (56.1) | 14.7 (58.5) | 17.3 (63.1) | 18.9 (66.0) | 18.4 (65.1) | 17.6 (63.7) | 17.1 (62.8) | 16.8 (62.2) | 16.3 (61.3) | 16.3 (61.3) | 15.2 (59.4) | 13.9 (57.0) | 16.3 (61.3) |
| Record low °C (°F) | 5.6 (42.1) | 3.9 (39.0) | 7.7 (45.9) | 11.1 (52.0) | 12.5 (54.5) | 12.0 (53.6) | 12.2 (54.0) | 11.3 (52.3) | 10.5 (50.9) | 10.0 (50.0) | 7.4 (45.3) | 6.4 (43.5) | 3.9 (39.0) |
| Average rainfall mm (inches) | 1.0 (0.04) | 0.5 (0.02) | 6.1 (0.24) | 20.1 (0.79) | 46.1 (1.81) | 958.4 (37.73) | 2,197.4 (86.51) | 1,806.9 (71.14) | 657.4 (25.88) | 157.6 (6.20) | 25.1 (0.99) | 5.9 (0.23) | 5,882.6 (231.60) |
| Average rainy days | 0.1 | 0.1 | 0.5 | 1.4 | 3.4 | 19.9 | 29.7 | 29.1 | 19.1 | 8.0 | 2.0 | 0.4 | 113.8 |
| Average relative humidity (%) (at 17:30 IST) | 49 | 39 | 41 | 51 | 67 | 92 | 98 | 98 | 94 | 76 | 64 | 56 | 69 |
Source 1: India Meteorological Department
Source 2: Government of Maharashtra

== History ==
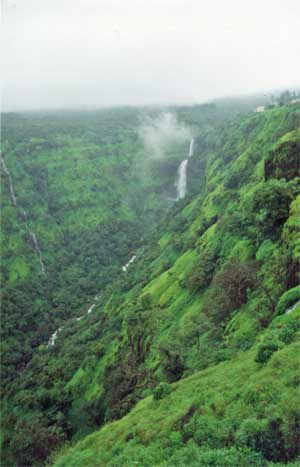
On the outskirts of Mahabaleshwar, towards Panchgani.

Legend says that a Yadava ruler from 13th century built a small temple and water tank at the source of the river Krishna. The Valley of Jawali, the area around Mahabaleshwar, was ruled by the More (clan) who were vassals of the Adilshahi sultanate of Bijapur. In 1656, the founder of Maratha empire, Chhatrapati Shivaji, killed the then ruler of Valley of Jawali, Chandrarao More, and seized the area. Around that time Shivaji also built a hill fort near Mahabaleshwar called Pratapgad fort.

=== British Raj era ===
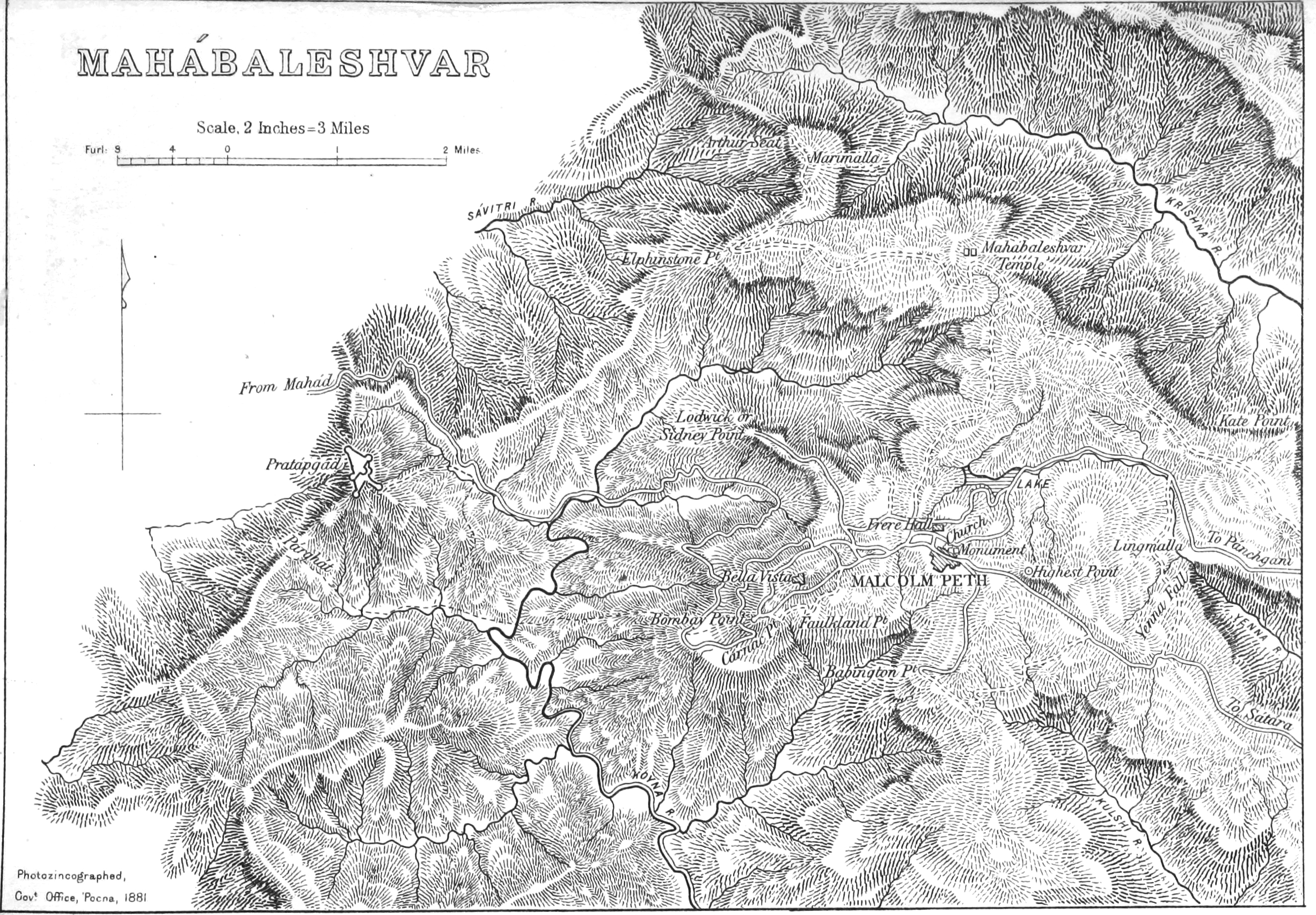
Map of the region (1881)

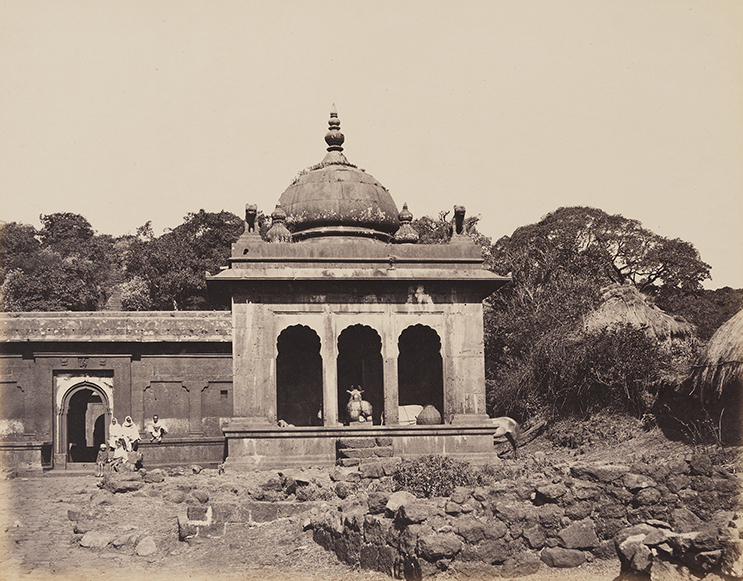
Panchaganga temple in Old Mahabaleshwar, 1850s

In 1819, after the demise of the Maratha empire, the British government ceded the hills around Mahabaleshwar to the vassal state of Satara. Colonel Lodwick (Later General Sir Lodwick) after climbing the mountains near Mahabaleshwar, recommended the place as a sanatorium for the British forces to governor Sir John Malcolm of Bombay presidency. The Raja of Satara was granted other villages in exchange for the British getting Mahabaleshwar in 1828. In old records Mahabaleshwar was even called Malcolm Peth after the governor.

Mahabaleshwar started gaining prominence when British officials of the Bombay presidency such as Sir Mountstuart Elphinstone, Arthur Malet (for whom the seat at "Point Arthur" is named), Carnac, and many others became regular visitors. Venna Lake was constructed in 1842 to collect water from perennial springs; the Venna River flows from this lake. Bartley Frere, the commissioner of Satara in the 1850s, built the road from Satara to Mahabaleshwar. In the mid 1800s, Mahabaleshwar was made into the summer capital of the Bombay presidency. Government spending led to rapid development of the area.

British officials spent part of their year in the area. Their wives spent a longer period of the year in the area to be with their children in local boarding schools in Mahabaleshwar and nearby Panchgani. The British rulers wanted to recreate the English landscape in the hill stations and to that end, European flora such as strawberries were introduced in Mahabaleshwar, and amenities such as libraries, theatres, boating lakes, and sports grounds were constructed.

Added to the scores of magnificent scenic "points", the perennial springs, streams, and waterfalls of Mahabaleshwar plateau, drew the English and others to Mahabaleshwar. By the end of the 19th century, it had become an attractive popular hill station. Raj Bhavan, the summer residence of the Governor of Maharashtra, is also located here. An older building named "The Terraces" was purchased in 1884 and rechristened as Giri Darshan in 1886.

"Babington House", is a colonial-style bungalow built in the shape of a cross with a deep veranda, elaborate metal work railing and extensive outhouses. It was formerly one of the country seats of the Dubash family, a Parsi ship chandler dynasty from Bombay, before they sold it to the Rahejas in the early 1970s. It contains a central dining room with a 24-seater table and a library pavilion with 1st edition books collected by the Dubash family, notably Jamsetjee "Jimmy" Kavasjee Dubash, a bibliophile and art collector.

== Demographics ==
As of 2011 India census, Mahabaleshwar had a population of 12,737. Males constituted 55% of the population and females 45%. Mahabaleshwar had an average literacy rate of 78%, higher than the national average of 74.04%: male literacy was 84%, and female literacy was 71%. In Mahabaleshwar, 11% of the population was at that time under 6 years of age. 90% of population speaks Marathi language.

== Transport ==
=== Rail ===
Nearest railway station to Mahabaleshwar is Satara, 60 km. Nearby major railway stations include Pune (120 km), Sangli railway station (170 km). State-run bus services are available in these locations to Mahabaleshwar. Rail station Diwan Khavati on Kokan Railway near Khed gives a route of 60 km via Poladpur to Mahabaleshwar.

=== Air ===
The nearest airport is Pune International Airport, serving the city of Pune, 120 km from Mahabaleshwar. Chhatrapati Shivaji Maharaj International Airport of Mumbai is 270 km.

== Tourism ==
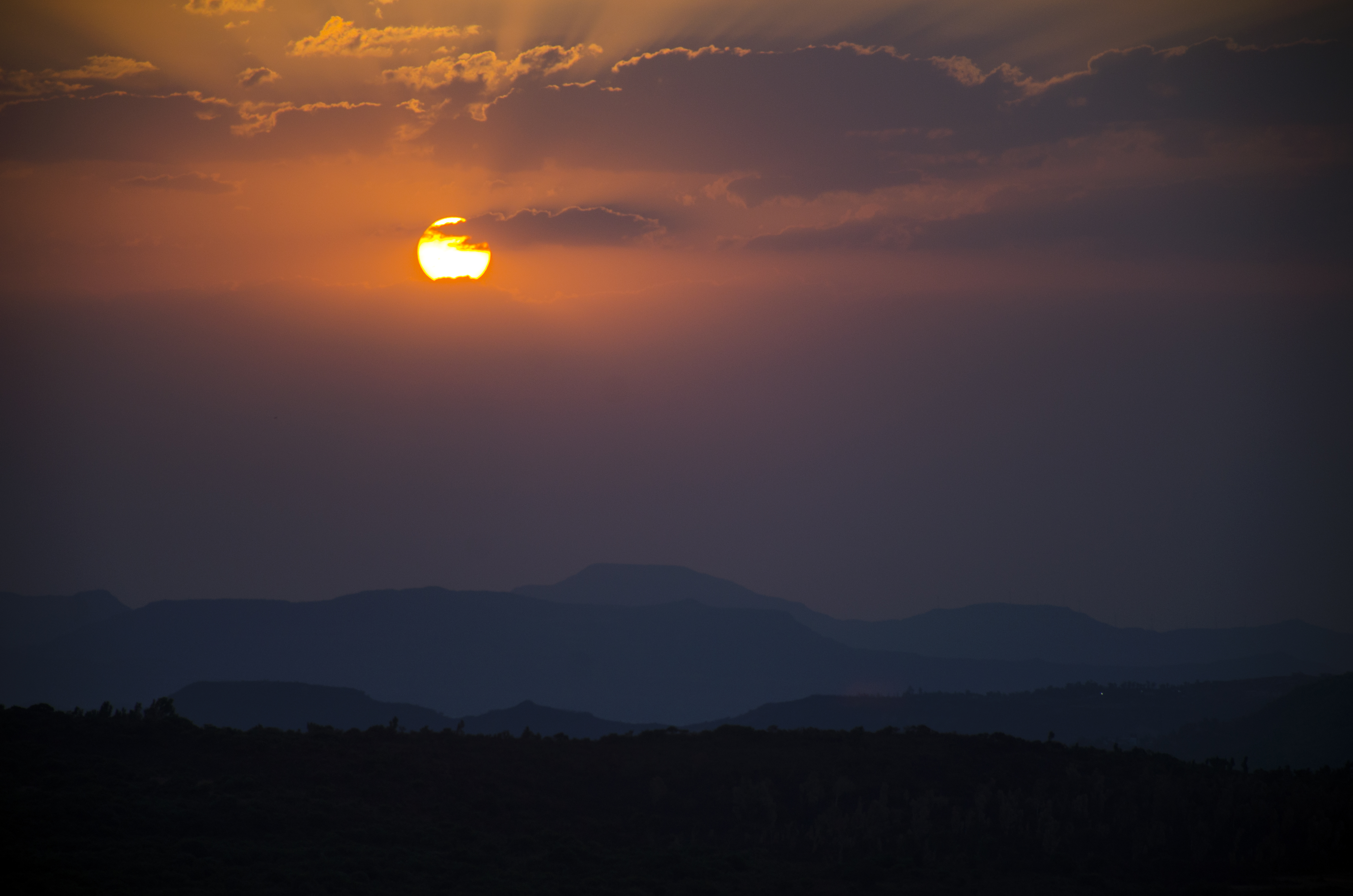
Willison Point Sunrise

Mahabaleshwar is a popular tourist destination in Maharashtra. Attractions include many hill side look out points with views of surrounding hills, valleys and forests such as Bombay Point, Arthur Seat, Kates Point, Lodwick-Wilson Point, and Elphinston Point. Wilson Point is the only location in Mahabaleshwar where both the sunrise and sunset can be seen. The town also has a man-made lake dating back to British era called Venna Lake. The lake is a popular place for boating. It is surrounded by a market and food stalls that are popular with the tourists. Other attractions include the Lingmala waterfall. Old Mahabaleshwar is a place of pilgrimage with its Mahadeo temple. The temple is the source of the five rivers Krishna, Koyna, Venna, Savitri and Gayatri. Being a relatively cool place, many temperate region crops such as strawberries, raspberries, and mulberries have been grown in Mahabaleshwar and surrounding hills. Principal amongst these crops is Strawberries. Strawberry plantations, and the produce they offer are also a popular tourist activity. The Mahabaleshwar strawberry was granted the geographical indication (GI) tag in 2010. As a popular tourist destination, Mahabaleshwar has hotels and accommodation to suit different budgets.

=== Pratapgad ===
A popular place to visit is the historic fort of Pratapgad built by Chatrapati Shivaji Maharaj. It is the site of the encounter between Shivaji Maharaj and Bijapur general, Afzal Khan, where the latter was defeated and killed by Chhatrapati Shivaji Maharaj. There are small shops, restaurants and a handicrafts store. Many schools also arrange educational trips to the fort. The fort is also on many trekking routes of the area.

=== Wilson Point ===
Highest point of Mahabaleshwar stands at 1439 m. Named after Leslie Wilson the Governor of Bombay Presidency (10 Dec 1923 - 8 Dec 1928). It is a popular viewpoint offering great views especially during sunrise.

=== Gallery of places of interest to tourism ===
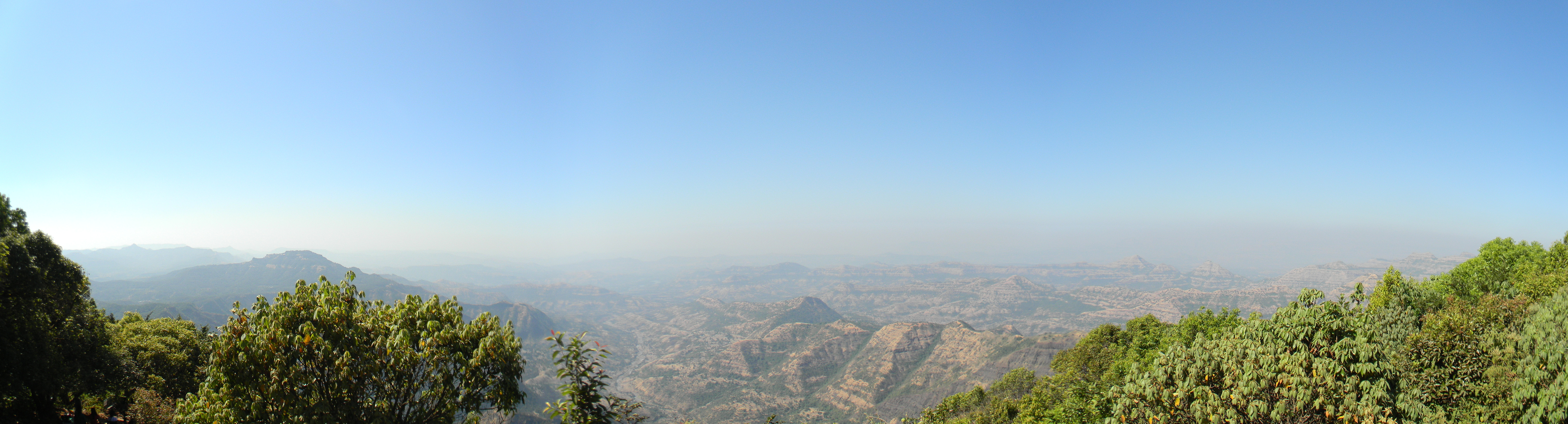
Panoramic view from Savitri Point, Mahabaleshwar

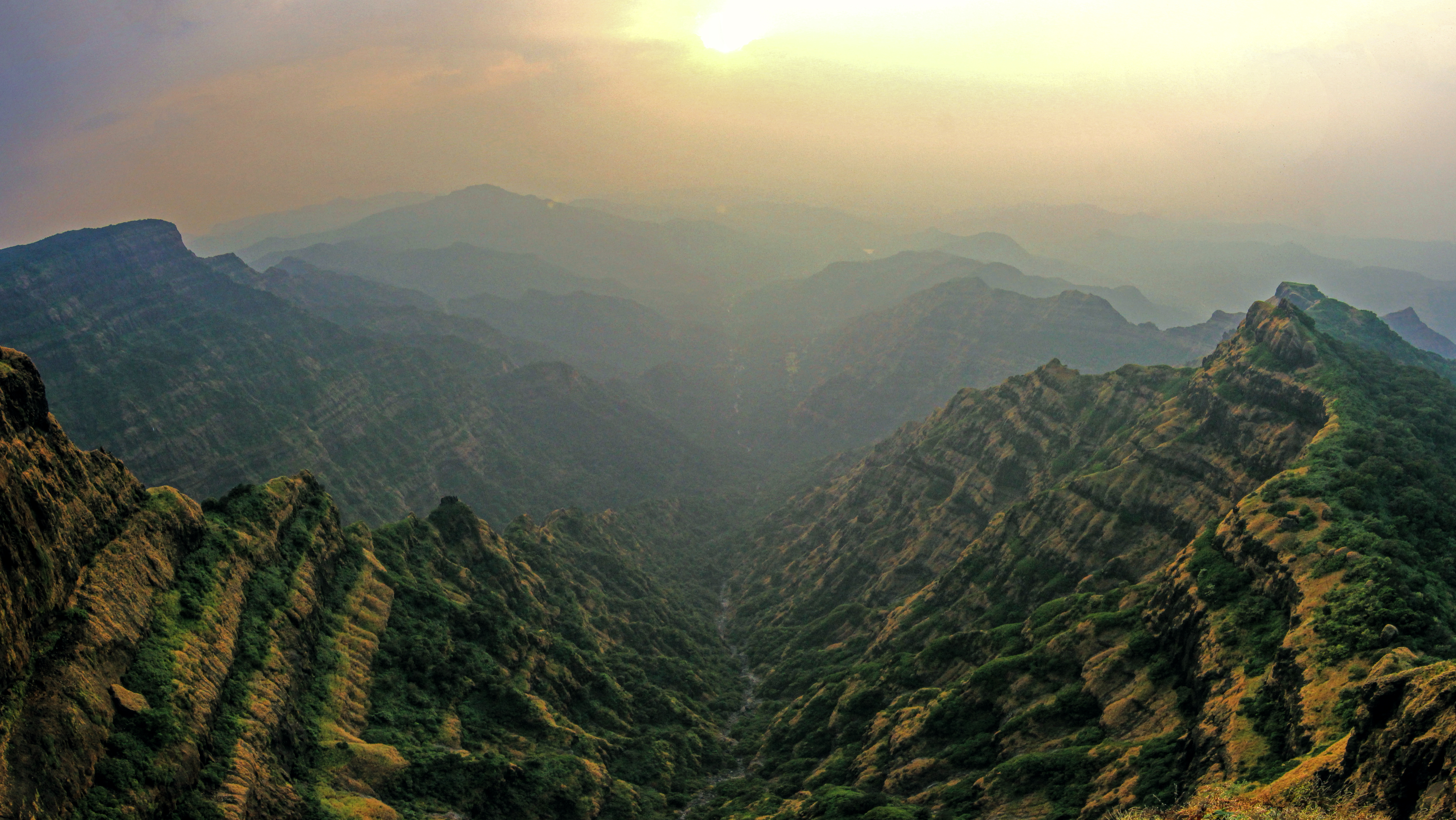
A view from Arthur seat point

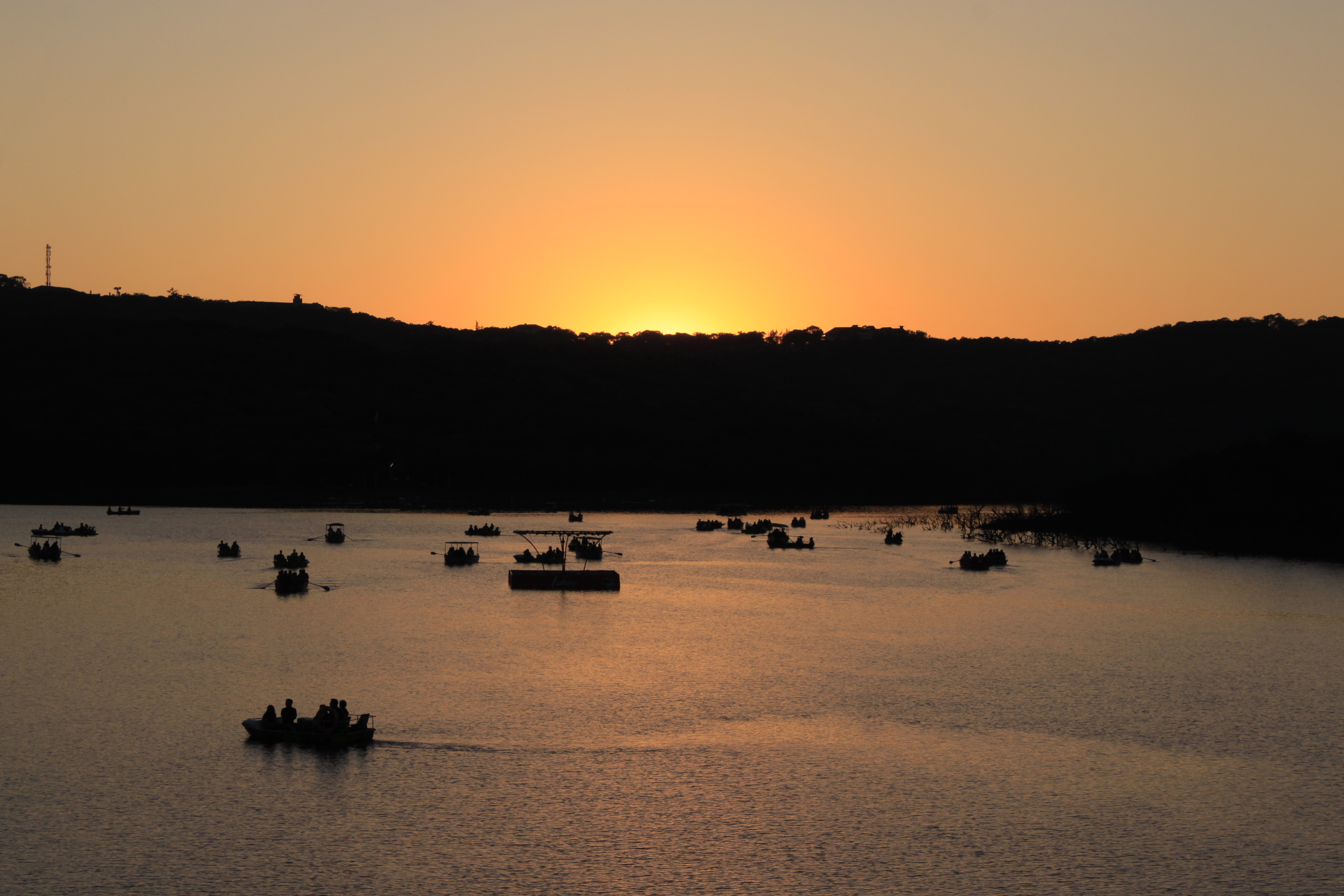
The Venna lake

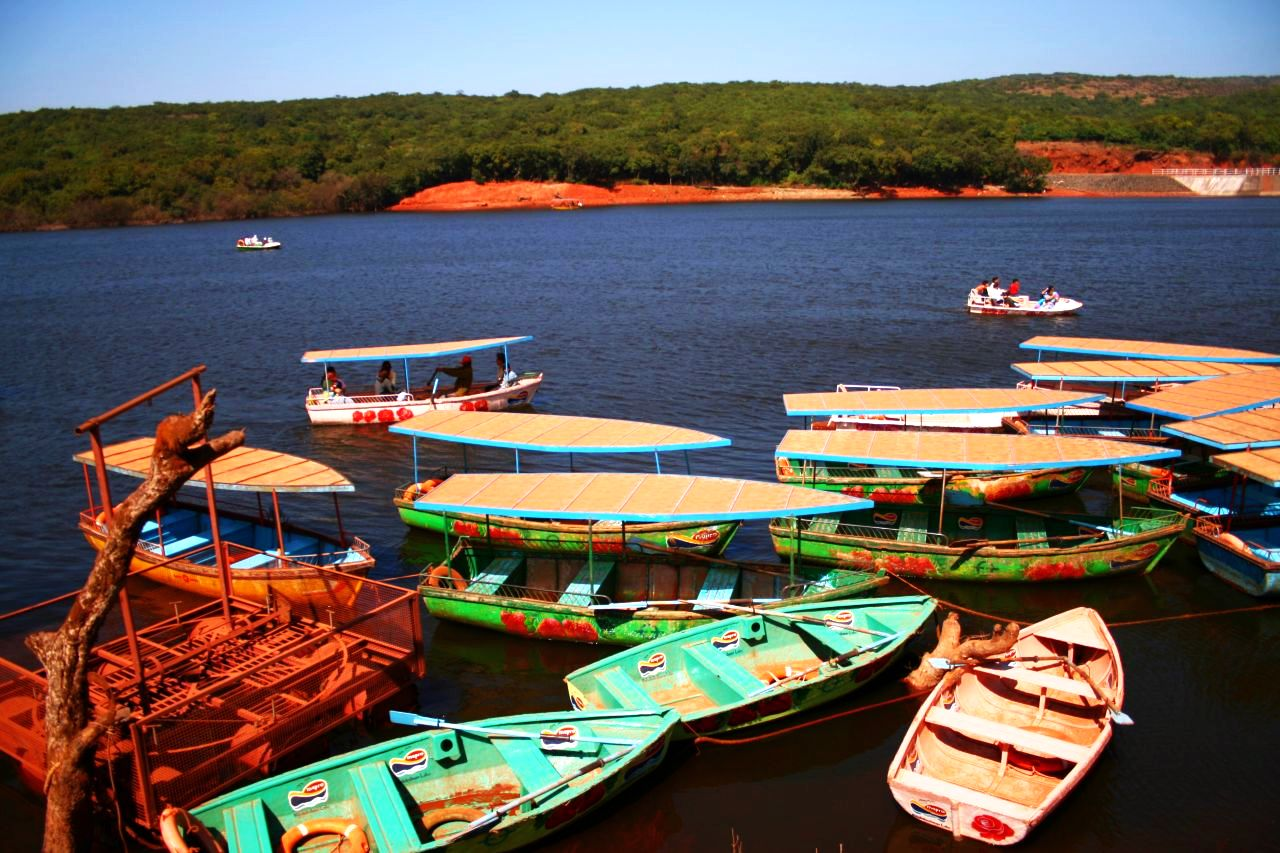
Boats on the Venna lake in Mahabaleshwar.

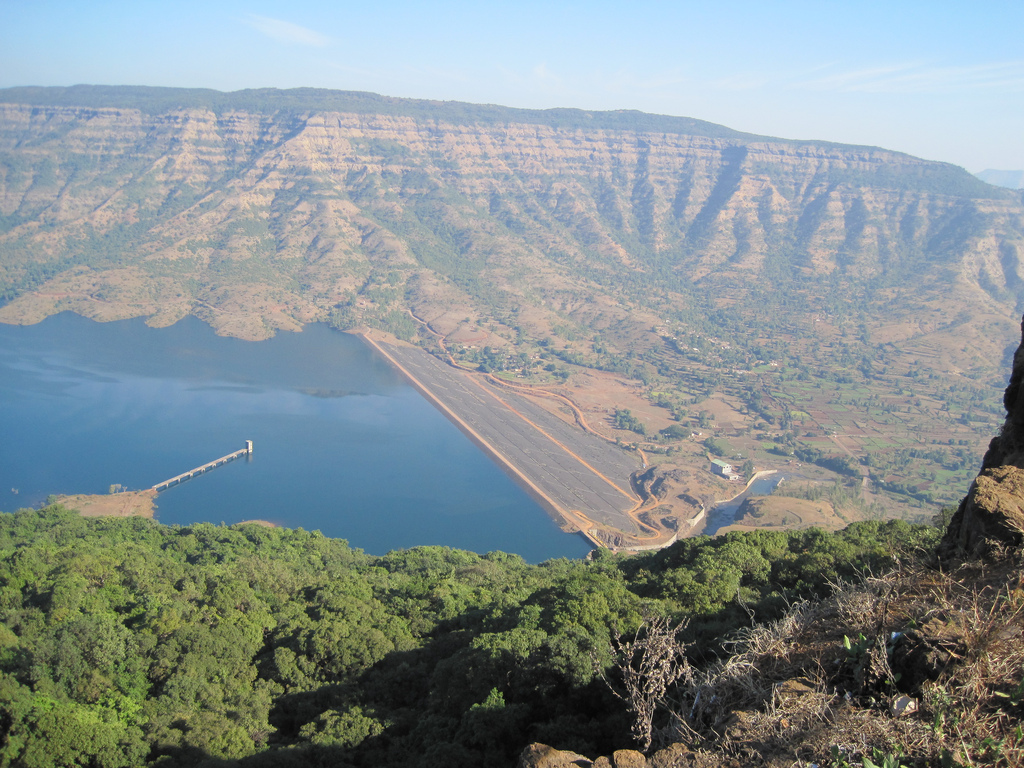
Balakwadi dam viewed from Kate's Point

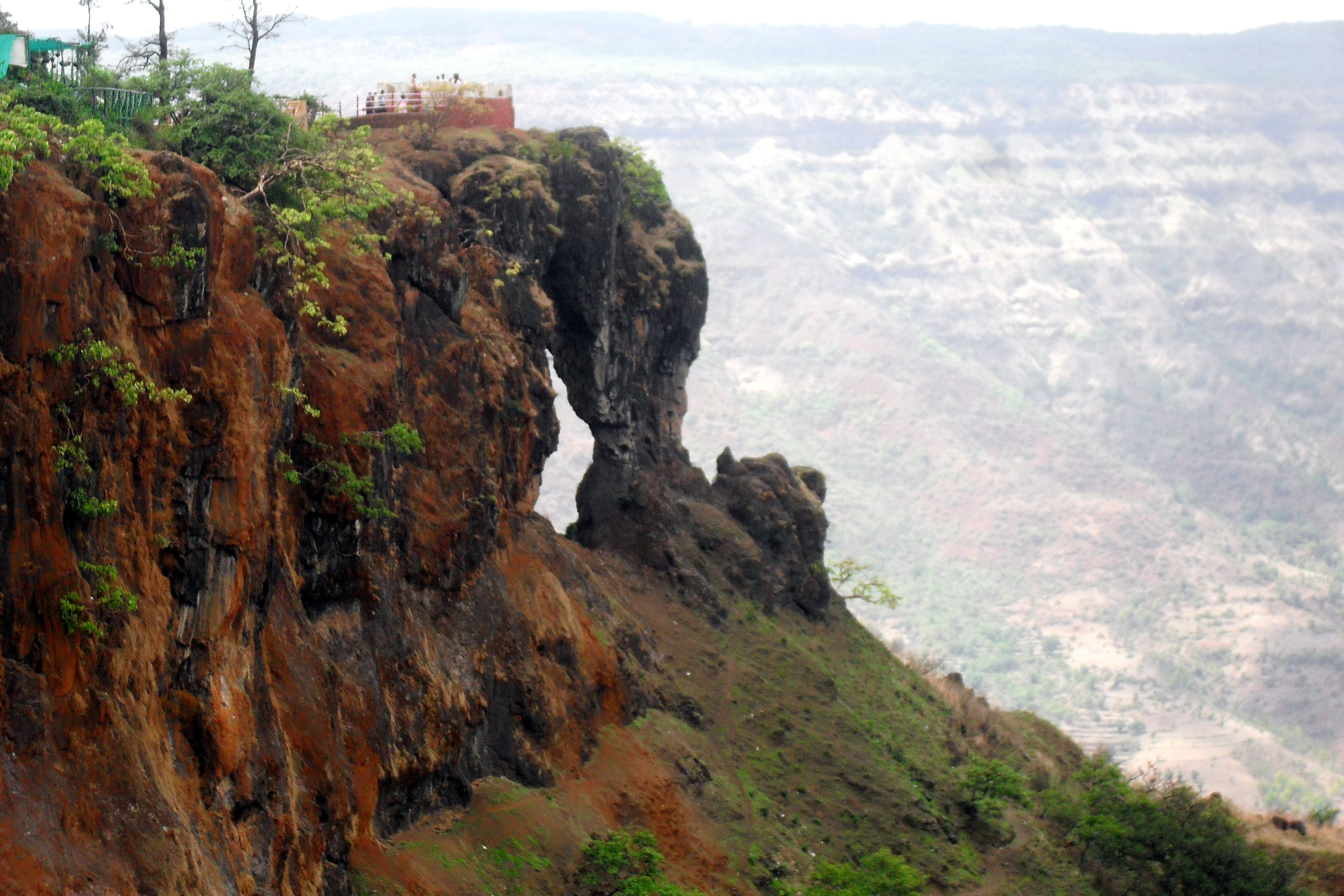
Needle hole rock, viewed from the point

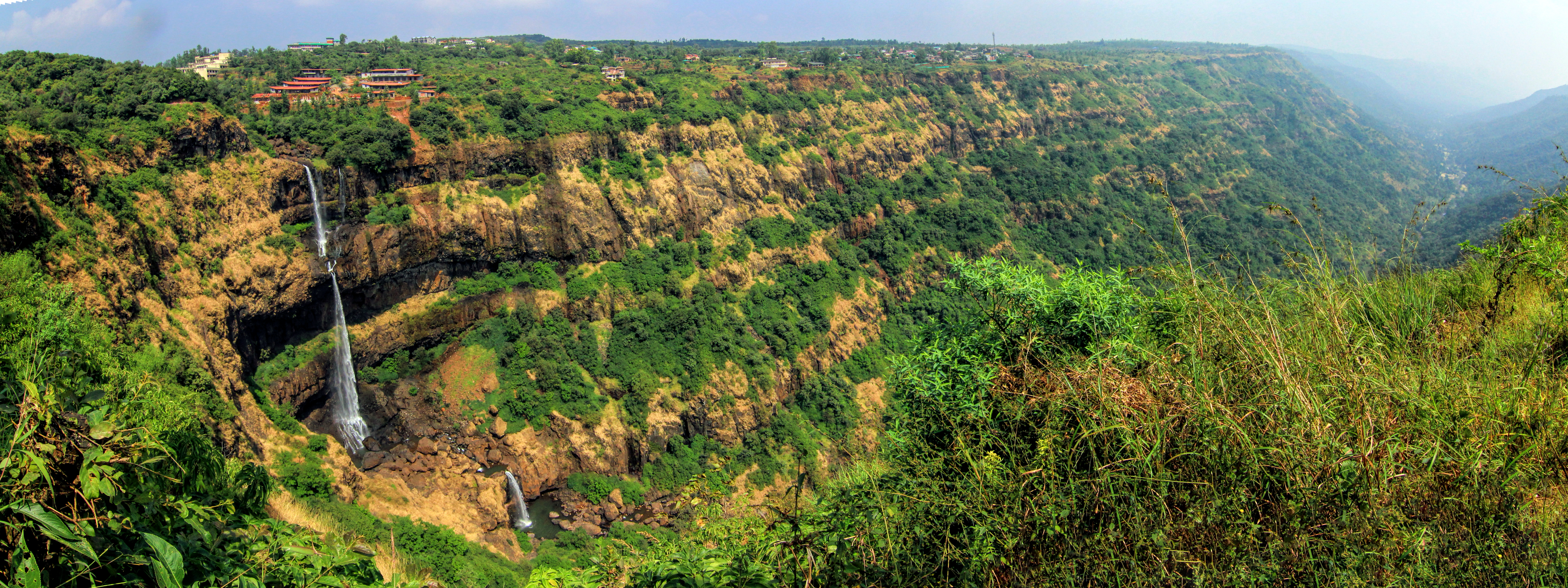
Panoramic view of Lingamala waterfalls

== In popular culture ==
Movies filmed in Mahabaleshwar include Raj Kapoor's Barsaat (1949),Hrishikesh Mukherjee's Anupama (1966) and Basu Chatterji's Chitchor (1976). In December 2020, some scenes of RRR (2022) were filmed around Mahabaleshwar, notably scenes involving Alia Bhatt. Some scenes of the Kannada film Vikrant Rona (2022), starring Sudeepa, were filmed around the hill station. Other hill stations such as Panchgani and Wai are also popular filming locations. For example, in 2021 Kartik Aaryan filmed the movie Freddy (2022) in Panchgani.
