= Gayatri River =

Coordinates: 17°18′N 74°10′E

Gayatri

Location
- Country: India
- State: Maharashtra

Basin features
- River system: Krishna River

The Gayatri River is a tributary of the Krishna River in western Maharashtra, India. It rises in Panchaganga temple in old Mahableshwar, a hill station in the Western Ghats.

The river meets the Krishna River, which is one of the three largest rivers in southern India by Karad. The river is small and is slow-flowing.

== Geography and history ==
Mahabaleshwar is the source of five rivers namely Krishna River, Koyna, Venna (Veni), Savitri, and Gayatri. The source is at the Panchaganga temple in old Mahabaleshwar. The legendary source of the river is a spout from the mouth of a statue of a cow in the ancient temple of Mahadev in Old Mahabaleshwar. Legend has it that Krishna is Vishnu himself as a result of a curse on the trimurtis by Savitri. Also, its tributaries Venna and Koyana are said to be Shiva and Brahma themselves. An interesting thing to notice is that 4 other rivers including Gayatri come out from the cow's mouth apart from Krishna and they all travel some distance before merging into Krishna. The biggest river Krishna River that flows across Maharashtra, Karnataka, Telangana and Andhra Pradesh.
