= Divan-khavati =

Village in Maharashtra

- Village
- Interactive map of Divan-khavati
- Country: India
- State: Maharashtra

Divan-khavati is a small village in Ratnagiri district, Maharashtra state in Western India. The 2011 Census of India recorded a total of 639 residents in the village. Divan-khavati's geographical area is approximately 632 hectares (1,560 acres).
