= Panchgani =

Panchgani Paachgani
- Hill station
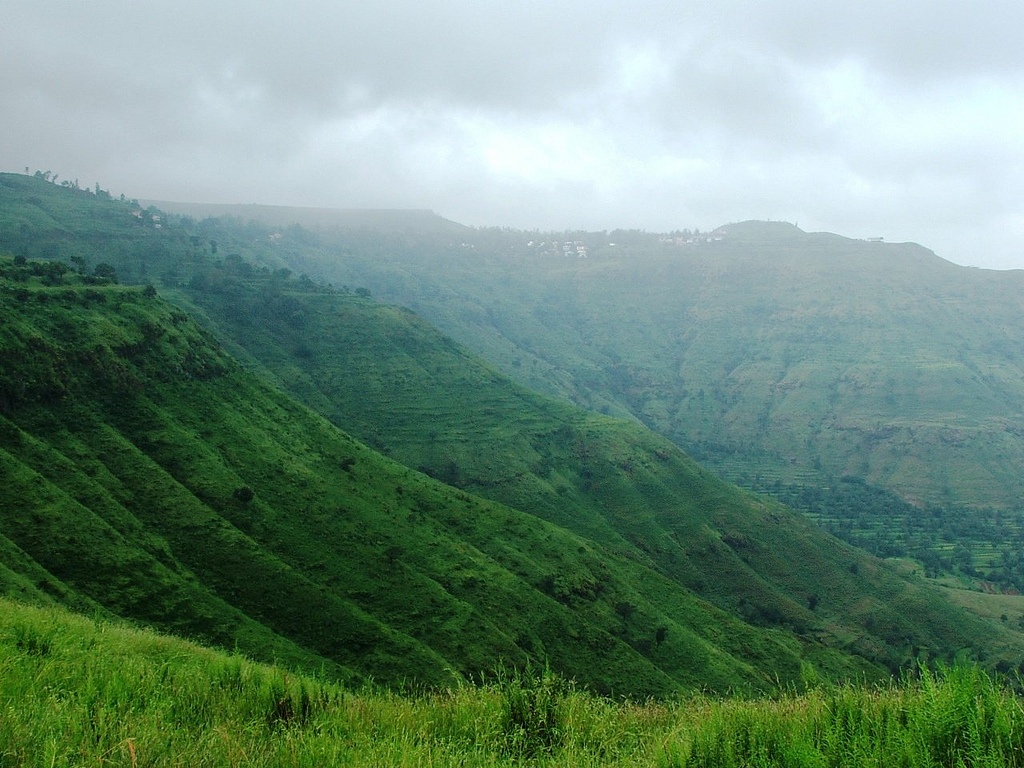
- View of Panchgani Hills

- Location in Maharashtra, India
- Coordinates: 17.925°N 73.8°E
- Country: India
- State: Maharashtra
- District: Satara
- Elevation: 1,293 m (4,242 ft)

Population (2001)
  - Total: 13,280

Languages
  - Official: Marathi
- Time zone: UTC+5:30 (IST)
- PIN: 412805

Panchgani, called Paachgani, is a hill station and municipal council in Satara district in Maharashtra, India. Panchgani attracts tourists throughout the year. It is also known for having many convent boarding schools.

Panchgani is around 108 kilometres from Pune and 250 kilometres from Mumbai.

== History ==
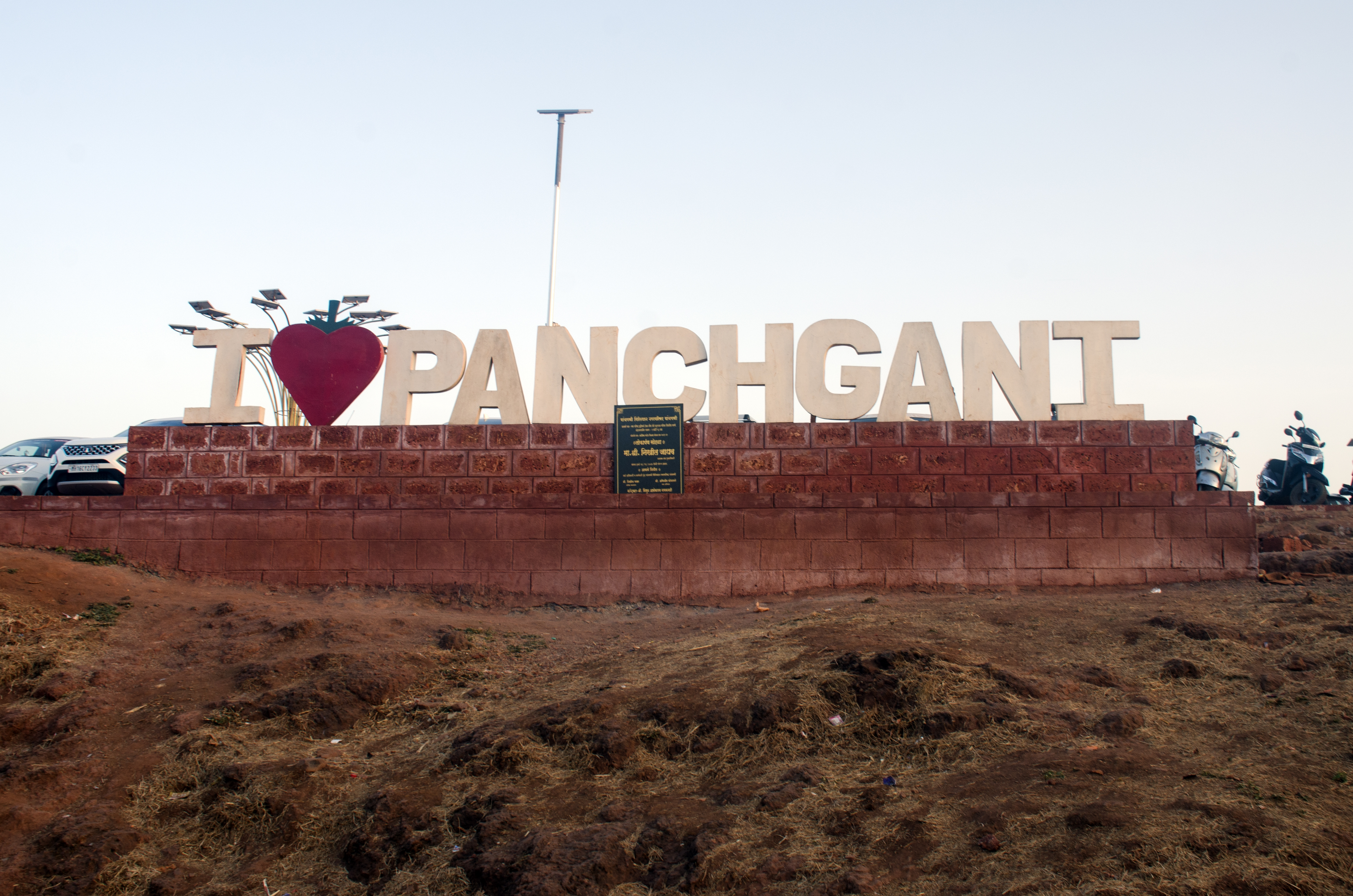
Table Land, Panchgani

Panchgani was developed by the British during the British Raj as a summer resort under the supervision of Lord John Chesson in the 1860s. Panchgani was developed as a retirement place because its climate remained pleasant throughout the year. He surveyed the hills of this region with Rustomji Dubash and finally decided on this nameless area around the five villages: Dandeghar, Godavali, Ambral, Khingar, and Taighat. The place was aptly named Panchgani, meaning "land between five villages", and Chesson was made the superintendent. To develop the infrastructure, Chesson encouraged various professionals - tailors, dhobis, butchers, vegetable vendors, building contractors - to also settle in Panchgani. The area below the bazaar was allotted to them, and is now known as the gaothan. He is credited with planting plant species from the western world in Panchgani, including silver oak and poinsettia, which have flourished since then in Panchgani. Chesson was buried in the graveyard of St. Peter's Church. In 1971 or '72, his death centenary was observed in a big way, when for the first time, the town folk and the schools participated together in a ceremony to remember the founder of Panchgani.

=== Boarding schools ===
A number of schools were started in the 19th century across different communities, and Panchgani started flourishing as an educational town.

In the 1890s, Kimmins High School was started for European boys and girls. 1902, the boys' section separated to become European Boys High School, now known as St. Peter's School, Panchgani, and Kimmins became an exclusive girls' school. In 1895, the Roman Catholic order of nuns known as "Daughters of The Cross" started St. Joseph's Convent School, Panchgani. All three boarding schools were modeled on the English Public Schools of that time, and were affiliated to Cambridge University. The board exams would be held in December, the question papers being sent from England by sea. The answer papers were sent back by sea and the results were declared in June.

Shortly afterward, other communities started their schools. These schools were affiliated to matriculation examination of the Bombay Presidency. The Parsi School, the first of these schools, later became the Billimoria School. The Muslim School became the Union High School, and is now known as Anjuman-I-Islam School. Both these schools were modelled on the English Public Schools. Hindu High School was started, now known as the Sanjeewan Vidyalaya. This was modelled on Rabindranath Tagore's Shantiniketan. The National Spiritual Assembly of the Baháʼís of India runs the New Era High School. A retired teacher from the Parsi High School, Mr. S. M. Batha started the S.M. Batha School, Panchgani International School and junior College is also one of the Best School in Panchgani.

=== Convalescence centre ===
The fresh air and invigorating climate of Panchgani made it a good place for convalescence. A well-known tuberculosis specialist from Bombay, Dr. Rustomji Bomanji Billimoria set up the Bel Air sanatorium, in the 1940s, as a centre for the treatment of TB. Till the advent of antibiotics, "Dalkieth" (Bel Air) was the premier place for the treatment of tuberculosis in the Bombay Presidency.

== Geography ==
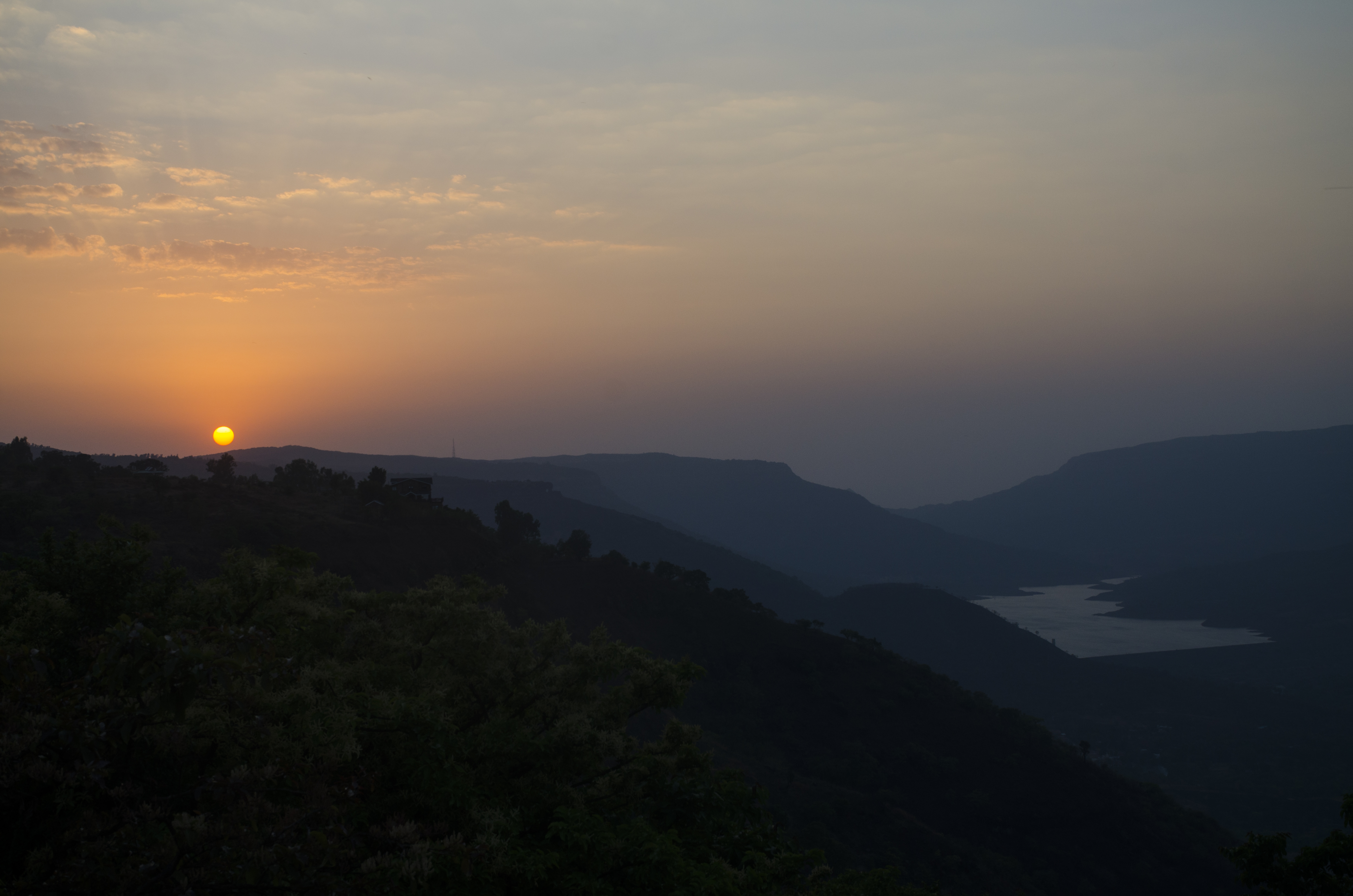
Sunset Dhom Lake, Panchgani

Panchgani is nestled in the middle of five hills in the Western Ghats alias Sahyādri mountain ranges. There are five villages around Panchgani named Dandeghar, Khingar, Godavali, Ambral & Taighat. The Krishnā River flows in the valley on which the Dhom Dam has been built approximately 9 km from Wai. The east of the Panchgani is Wai, Bavdhan & Nagewadi dam, at west is Gureghar, at the south is Khingar & Rajpuri & on the north is Dhom Dam. The five hills surrounding Panchgani are topped by a volcanic plateau, These plateaus, alternatively known as "table land", are a part of the Deccan Plateau, they were raised by pressure between the earth plates. The area has high seismic activity, with an epicenter near Koynānagar where the Koynanagar Dam and a hydroelectric power plant have been built.

=== Environmental issues ===
In recent times, Paachgani has been facing ecological problems because of poorly controlled commercial activities, excessive traffic, and temperature inversion (because of humidity) from the new dams which have been built in the vicinity for water storage.

== Weather ==
The temperature in Panchgani is around 12 degrees Celsius during winter, and sometimes reaches 34 degrees Celsius during summer; humidity level is very low except in the Monsoon. Monsoon rainy season spans between June and September.

Climate data for Panchgani
Month	Jan	Feb	Mar	Apr	May	Jun	Jul	Aug	Sep	Oct	Nov	Dec	Year
Mean daily maximum °C (°F)	23.9 (75.0)	25.1 (77.2)	28.9 (84.0)	31.2 (88.2)	31.3 (88.3)	24.2 (75.6)	20.7 (69.3)	20.8 (69.4)	21.3 (70.3)	24.7 (76.5)	23.2 (73.8)	23.1 (73.6)	24.9 (76.8)
Mean daily minimum °C (°F)	14.2 (57.6)	15.3 (59.5)	18.5 (65.3)	20.6 (69.1)	20.1 (68.2)	17.2 (63.0)	17.1 (62.8)	16.4 (61.5)	16.4 (61.5)	17.3 (63.1)	14.7 (58.5)	13.9 (57.0)	16.8 (62.3)
Average precipitation mm (inches)	4.1 (0.16)	1.3 (0.05)	4.8 (0.19)	25.9 (1.02)	43.9 (1.73)	261.1 (10.28)	697.2 (27.45)	404.1 (15.91)	221.5 (8.72)	126.7 (4.99)	66.0 (2.60)	8.4 (0.33)	1,865 (73.43)
Source: Government of Maharashtra

== Demographics ==
As per Census India 2011, Panchgani town has a population of 13,393 of which 6,974 are males and 6,419 are females. Males constituted 52.07% of the population, and females, 47.93%. The population of children between age 0-6 is 1,368 which is 10.21% of total. The sex-ratio of Panchgani is around 920 compared to 929 which is average of Maharashtra state. Literacy rate of Panchgani is 80.56% out of which 84.6% males are literate and 76.16% females are literate. There are 9.62% Scheduled Caste (SC) and 2.75% Scheduled Tribe (ST) of total population in Panchgani.

== Education ==
Panchgani is known for its boarding schools established since the late 19th century. They attract students from the nearby cities of Mumbai and Pune. The schools in Panchgani are:

- Kimmins High School
- St. Peter's School, Panchgani
- St. Joseph's Convent School, Panchgani
- Billimoria School
- Anjuman-I-Islam School
- Sanjeewan Vidyalaya
- New Era High School
- S. M. Batha High School
- Panchgani international school and Junior College
- Shalom International

== Economy ==
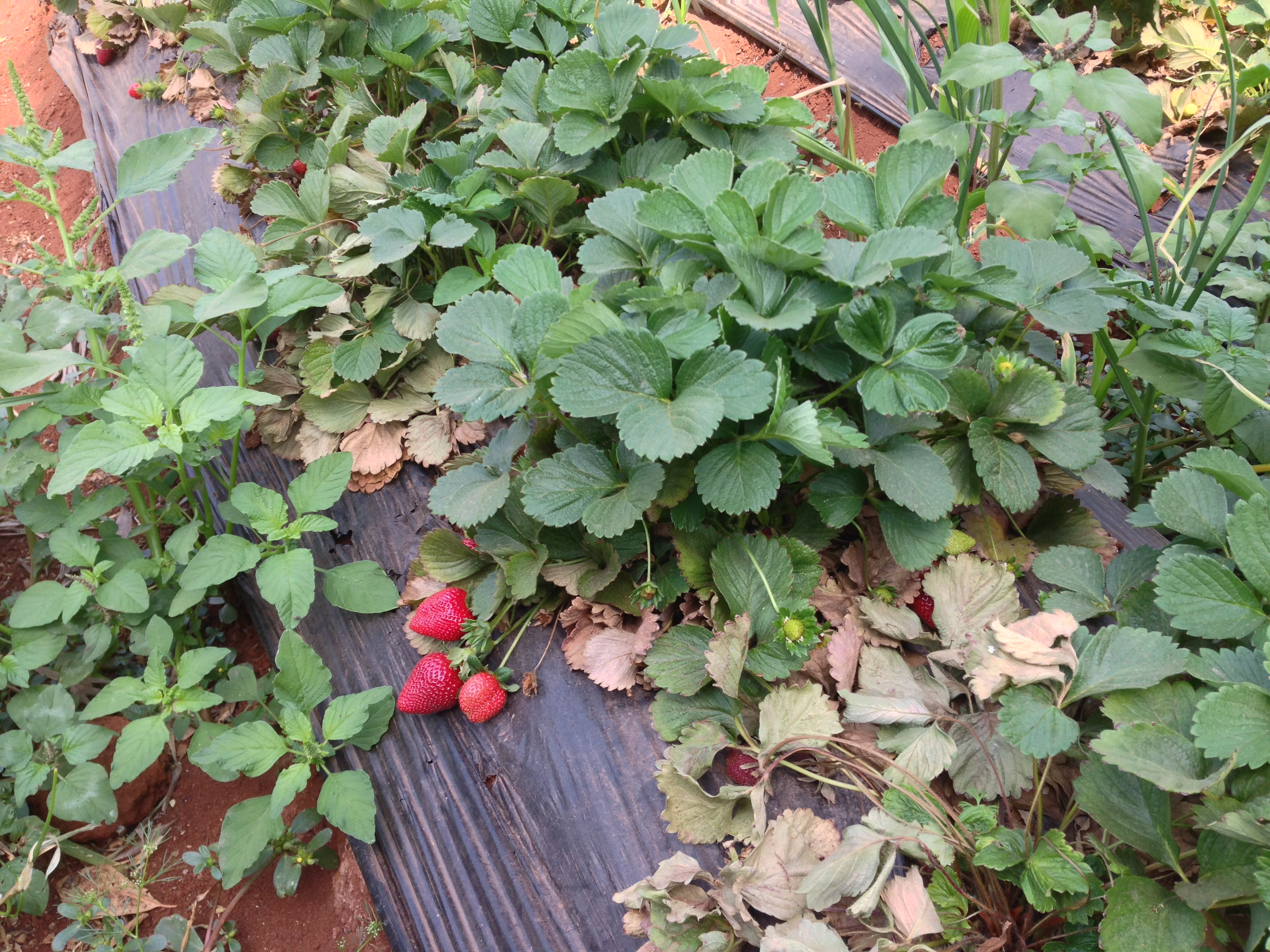
Strawberries being cultivated in a farm in Panchgani

Strawberries are cultivated year round in Panchgani and Mahabaleshwar region. The strawberry grown here has been granted a Geographical indication status.

Tourism- The town is a popular tourist resort in Maharashtra due to its proximity to Mumbai and Pune. In the past till around the 70s the town used to close down for tourists in the monsoon season but now the town is a year round tourist destination

=== Asia Plateau ===
The global charity Initiatives of Change opened "a centre for introspection and dialogue", a 68-acre campus called Asia Plateau at Panchgani in 1967. Over the past four decades Asia Plateau has been used for holding training programmes and conferences of Initiatives of Change, particularly to address issues of corruption and governance within companies and public institutions. On certain occasions, the centre is used for programmes of like-minded institutions. It is also running a model farm and rural training centre called Grampari, aiming at propagating good practices in the Indian villages, to foster hygiene, local democracy and economic development. There are also various jam, syrup and crushes stores found throughout the town.

== Events ==
- Strawberry festival: The Strawberry Festival is held every year in summer in Panchgani.
- I Love Panchgani festival: The I Love Panchgani festival takes place every winter in Panchgani. Schools and local businesses participate in the festival.

== Tourist attractions ==
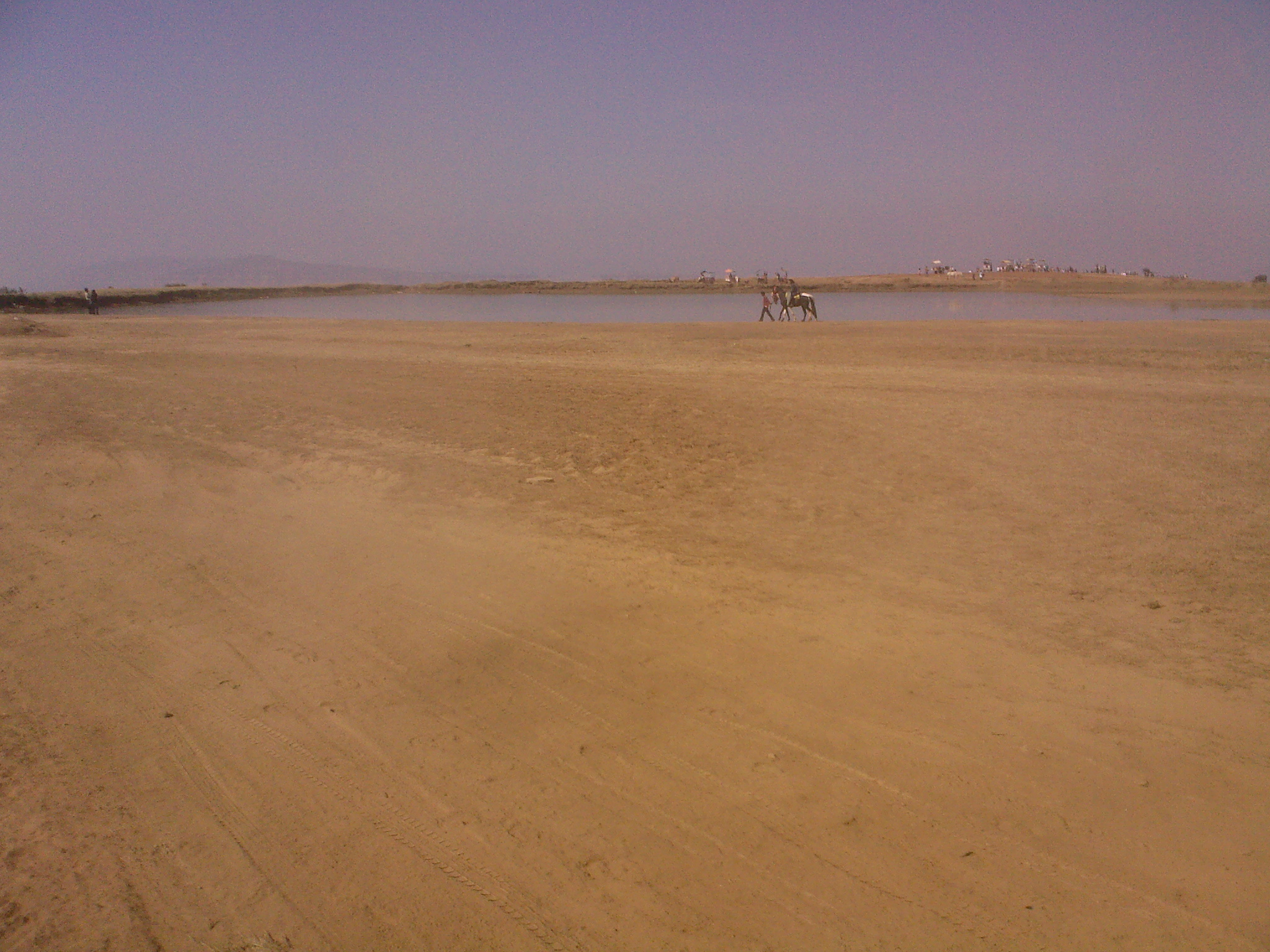
Tableland, Panchgani

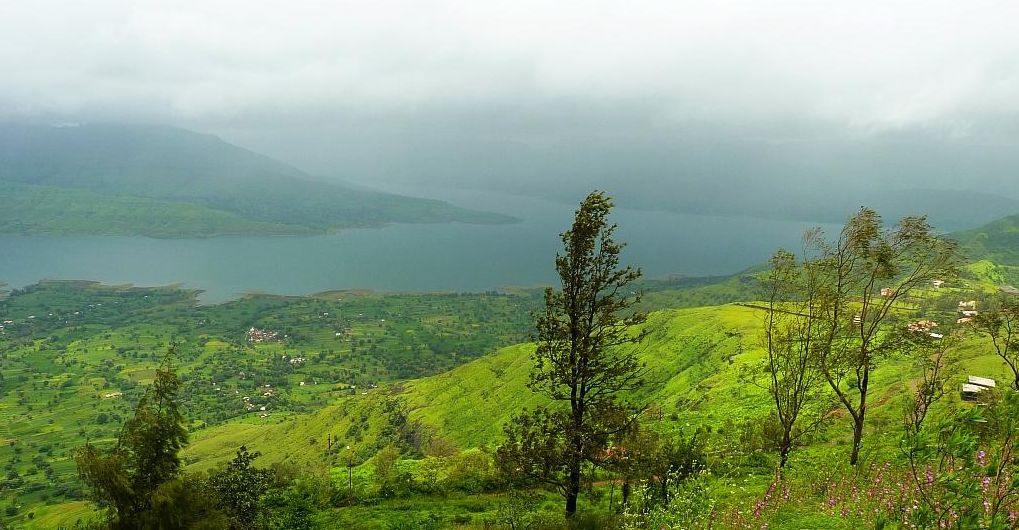
View from Sydney Point, Panchgani in monsoon

- Tableland: Table Land is the second longest mountain plateau in Asia. It is capped with laterite rock. It is located at a height of 1387 m above MSL. There is a small lake within this table land.
- Sydney Point: This point is situated on a hillock facing the Krishna Valley, and overlooks the waters of the Dhom Dam, and Pāndavgad and Mandhārdeo. Sydney's point is about 2 km from Panchgani bus stand.
- Parsi Point: This point is situated toward Mahabaleshwar, and overlooks the Krishna valley and the waters of the Dhom Dam.
- Devil's Kitchen: Situated at the south of the table land, the Devil's Kitchen has a mythology associated with it: It is believed that the Pāndavas of the Mahābhārat epic had stayed here for a while. Pāndavgad caves (near Wāi) are said to be built by them then.
- Mapro Garden: Mapro Gardens is a garden park known for their strawberry produce. It is located in village of Gureghar on the way to Mahabaleshwar and developed and maintained by Mapro, a food processing company.

== In popular culture ==
The "Table Land " was a shooting spot for Raja Hindustani, Mela, Taare Zameen Par and the 2010 Hindi feature film Khatta Meetha. Television series Pyaar Kii Ye Ek Kahaani were filmed here. In 2021 Kartik Aaryan filmed Freddy (2022).

The 1998 Indian Hindi-language horror series Woh, adapted from Stephen King's It, is set in Panchgani. While King’s story takes place in the fictional town of Derry, Maine, Woh is set in this real hill station, whose misty setting lends the series a distinctly Indian character.

== Transport ==
Panchgani is well-connected by road to major cities in Maharashtra, though it lacks direct rail or air infrastructure due to its mountainous terrain in the Western Ghats.

=== Road ===
Panchgani is primarily accessed via the Wai-Panchgani-Mahabaleshwar Road (State Highway 72), which connects it to the town of Wai and further to the Mumbai-Bengaluru National Highway (NH-48) at Surur.

Bus Services: The Maharashtra State Road Transport Corporation (MSRTC) operates regular bus services connecting Panchgani to neighboring towns like Mahabaleshwar (19 km), Satara (50 km), and Wai (12 km), as well as major urban centers like Pune (98 km) and Mumbai (250 km). Private luxury buses and operators also run daily services along these routes.

=== Rail ===
Panchgani does not have its own railway station.

- Satara railway station - 60 km
- Sangli railway station - 160 km
- Pune railway station - 120 km
- Wathar railway station - 60 km

Wathar Railway Station, located approximately 45 km away on the Pune–Miraj line, is the nearest railhead, though it has limited train connectivity.

Satara Railway Station (60 km) and Pune Junction (120 km) serve as the primary major rail hubs for travelers visiting the hill station, providing comprehensive connections across India.

=== Air ===
Pune International Airport (110 km) is the nearest functional airport, offering domestic flights to major Indian cities and select international destinations.

Chhatrapati Shivaji Maharaj International Airport in Mumbai (260 km) serves as the nearest major international gateway.

Local Transport

Within the town, local transit is supported by auto-rickshaws and tourist taxis available for point-to-point travel and sightseeing. Due to the town's compact nature and ecological considerations, walking and horse-riding are traditionally popular methods for navigating shorter scenic stretches, such as the Table Land plateau
