= Garavadi, Satara =

Village in Maharashtra

Garavadi Ramnagar
- Village
- Location in Maharashtra, India
- Coordinates: 17.769653°N 74.282556°E
- Country: India
- State: Maharashtra
- District: Satara

Area
  - Total: 2.3 km^{2} (0.89 sq mi)

Population (2011)
  - Total: 1,500
  - Density: 650/km^{2} (1,700/sq mi)

Languages
  - Official: Marathi
- Time zone: UTC+5:30 (IST)
- Postal code: 415504
- Postal code: 415504
- Area code: 0
- Vehicle registration: MH-11

Garavadi (Ramnagar) is a census village in the Satara district, located in the India state of Maharashtra. There are a total of approximately 240 families residing within its borders. The village is located in the Khatav Tehsil of Satara district in Maharashtra, India. It is 32 km away from the sub-district headquarters of Vaduj, and 54 km away from the district headquarters of Satara. Research from 2009 shows that Garavadi village is also classified as a gram panchayat (village council). According to the India Census in 2011, the village was recorded to have a population of 997, 478 of which were males, and the other 519 females.

Garavadi is surrounded by a big mountains. In the center of the village, there is the temple of Ram. Agriculture is the main livelihood practiced in this village, with more than 75% of the total area being used for agricultural activities. It is located on the east side of the Diskal Village.

In an attempt to follow the Constitution of India and Panchyati Raaj Act, Garavadi village is administered by Sarpanch (Head of Village) who is its elected representative. Garawadi is mostly in a dry area in the Satara district. The Maharashtra government is implementing various water-saving projects. It protects lakes, waterways, Talavs, Nala, buildings.

== Demographics ==
Marathi is the local language and most widely spoken almost 100%. The village has an identity of people from all caste. The majority of people are Hindu Maratha. One of the prominent groups in Garavadi is the Kadam Shedge clan. Other clans include Jagadale and Bitale.

== Geography ==
Garavadi belongs to the Desh, Maharashtra region. It is located 50 km west of the district headquarters of Satara. The total geographical area of the village is 1069 hectares. Garavadi has a total population of 997 people. There are about 231 houses in the Garavadi village. Phaltan is the nearest town to Garavadi, and it is approximately 35 km away. It is also 23 km from Khatav and 280 km from the state capital Mumbai. The local pin code is 415504, and the post office is Diskal (Satara).

Satara, Pusegaon, Phaltan, Budh, Manjarwadi, Kalchondi, Shenwadi, Mok, Diskal, Pandharwadi, Chinchani, Kalewadi, Anpatwadi, and Shindewadi are other nearby cities.

== Economic activity ==
The main economic activity in the village is agriculture, and most people living there are agriculturists. Others have careers in politics, the army, government administration, and education. Most jobs are located in Mumbai, PhaltanPune, and Satara.

Farming covers gram flour and groundnuts for 5 to 6 months of the year. It also covers sorghum, kharif, rabi, and jawar for 3 to 4 months. There is wide cultivation of other fruits such as mangoes and bananas.

== Temples ==
The Gram Daivat of the village is the goddess Nishnai Mata. In 1930, a temple was built to replace the existing ruins of the original shrine. This shrine is spacious and is 20 feet in height. The temple was modified by villagers in 2012. The interior of the temple is newly designed, but with a historic theme.

The second temple of the god Ram is located in the center of the village. Near the north side of the temple, there is a Hanuman temple and Jyotiba temple. There are a few other temples and light-towers in the vicinity. There are many other temples in Garavadi including Vagjai Mata, Shiva, Vithoba, Rukmini, Temple Rama, Lakshmana, and Sita Temple.

== Festival ==
On the second day of the Hindu calendar, a large fair is held for Akshya Tritiya.

== Food ==
The most common cuisine is spicy foods. Those foods include Bhakri, rice, Harbara, and vegetables (such as Fenugreek and Brinjal). Non-vegetarians prefer mutton and chicken. Meat is normally served with papads, specially made of Sago, for fasting members. Mircha, a ground green chili paste fried with onion and garlic, is also served. Kanda Bhaji, Misal, Vada pav, and Bhel are some of the most popular snacks. Locally made Sevai served with hot milk and jaggery is a local dessert. Groundnuts boiled in hot salted water and sun-dried is a favorite local food. Chakulya (चकुल्या), a local delicacy made of wheat flour strips cut and put into a spicy dal and served with rice and some ghee is also popular.

== Climate and rainfall ==
The climate is generally moderate with temperatures during the summer months (March to mid-June) reaching a maximum of 34 °C. In the winter months (November to March), it drops to 12°C. The climate is pleasant during the summers but is very cold during the monsoon. The climate is moderate for the remaining months. The monsoon period starts in the month of June, with the most precipitation in July and August. The total rainfall is 1500mm.

Garavadi participate to 'Water cup' in 2019 to have better water resources https://youtu.be/-8nqnOcoLqE

== Soil ==
Black cotton soil is the predominant soil type, as is the case with most of the districts on the Deccan Plateau. Lateritic soil covers many parts of the western tahsils of Khatav, Dahivadi, Satara, Phaltan. It is typically clay in type and reddish in color. Soil fertility is particularly low around the Village Farm.

== Transport ==
Road

Garavadi Village is connected to Diskal by roads around 8 km in length. Satara, Khatav, Phaltan, Pusegaon, Dahivadi, are nearby towns to Garavadi. The village is connected to nearby villages by a small road.

Rail

There is no railway station within a 10 km radius of Garavadi. Satara Railway Station (near to Satara), Shirravde Railway Station (near to Karad), Rahimatpur Railway Station (near to Rahimatpur), Jarandeshwar Railway Station (near to Satara), and Masur Railway Station (near to Karad) are the nearest railway stations reachable from nearby towns. Sangli Railway Station is the major railway station, being 102 km from Garavadi.

Nearby Railway Stations:

- Rahimatpur railway station - 23 km
- Wathar railway station - 21.6 km
- Koregaon railway station - 24.4 km
- Lonand railway station - 27.9 km
- Jarandeshwar railway station - 28.0 km
- Targaon railway station - 29 km
- Satara railway station - 50 km

== Nearby ==
Villages

- Mahabaleshwar Wadi
- Kalchondi
- Shenwadi
- Manjarwadi
- Mol
- Diskal
- Pandharwadi
- Chinchani
- Kalewadi
- Anpatwadi
- Shindewadi

Cities

- Satara (city) - 50 km
- Karad - 46 km
- koregaon - 30 km
- khatav - 20 km
- Phaltan - 42 km
- Mahuli - 37 km
- Satara - 42 km

Talukas

- Katav - 20 km
- Koregaon- 23 km
- Man - 23 km
- Satara - 42 km
- Karad - 80 km

Airports

- Karad Airport - 80 km
- Kolhapur Airport - 170 km
- Lohegaon Airport - 150 km
- Chhatrapati Shivaji International Airport - 280 km

Tourist places

- Sajjangad - 60 km
- Satara - 50 km
- Thoseghar Waterfalls - 55 km
- Chalake Wadi - 57 km
- Panchgani - 75 km
- Mahabaleshwar - 75 km

Forts

- Ajinkyatara - 50 km
- Sajjangad - 56 km
- Tatavada - 15 km

Districts

- Satara - 50 km
- Pune – 150 km
- Sangli - 130 km
- Kolhapur - 170 km
- Raigad - 230 km
- Ratnagiri - 210km

Engineering Colleges Near Garavadi

- A.B.I.T Polytechnic Shahunagar Shendre (Satara)
- Satara Polytechnic Khindwadi Satara
- K.B.P. Polytechnic, Panmalevadi varied Satara
- Gourishankar Polytechnic, Limb Khind Satara
- Government Eng. College, Vidhyanagar Karad
- Satara College of Pharmacy Degaon, Satara

Schools & Colleges near Garavadi

- Chhatrapari Shivaji Art College Satara
- Dhanjay Gadagil Commerce College Satara
- Yashwantrao Chavan Science College Satara
- Maharaja Shivaji High School & Jr. College, Satara
- Annasaheb Kalyani Vidyalaya Satara
- Ismailsaheb Mulla Law College Satara
- Sainik School Satara
