= Mahimangad =

Fort in Maharashtra, India

- Satara District, Maharashtra, India

Site information
- Owner: Government of India
- Open to the public: Yes

Location
- India
- Coordinates: 17.7033939°N 74.462843°E

Mahimangad Fort (Maan T; 17 40' N, 74 25' E; RS. Koregaon 20 m. W; p. 3,591), in Maan lies within the village limits of Mahimangad village about five and a half miles west of Dahivadi.

== Description ==
The easiest way to it is by the Satara-Pandharpur road to a point about half a mile west of the pass descending into the lower parts of the Maan taluka. From this point a broad track branches off northwards to the fort which lies not more than half a mile from the road. There are three hamlets close on the north of the fort which towers about 250 feet above them. It consists of a flat nearly triangular table land with the apex to the east surmounting a perpendicular scarp of black trap below which are steep slopes of short grass with a little soil. The sides are overgrown in places with prickly pear especially on the north-west corner. The ascent should be made from the second hamlet which will be encountered on approaching the Pandharpur road from the north-west. A path about five feet wide with rude steps at intervals of almost every yard takes to the fort. A steep walk of about five minutes leads up to the gateway, the immediate approach to which is in places almost blocked by prickly pear. The path which leads up the side in a south-east direction here takes a turn at nearly right angles to the south-west. But before entering, the visitor will probably go some fifteen yards further to see a small tank cut in the rock, the site of an excellent spring always full of water and furnishing the neighbouring hamlets with their hot weather supply. The gateway has been cut in the scarp about thirty feet below the summit. The passage cut is about six feet wide but the gateway narrows to about five feet. It consisted as usual of a single pointed arch about seven feet high of well cut masonry the top of which has fallen in. Inside are twenty-two rock-cut steps which wind through a right angle and lead to the top facing east. The inner side of the curve is as usual protected and the way up the steps proportionately narrowed by a curtain of solid masonry. On emerging on the top and proceeding east along the north face of the fort on right hand is a small hillock on which stood the office now in ruins. A little further on is a water tank thirty feet square, originally built of well cut masonry, but now a great deal fallen in. Near it are two small tanks lined with cement for the storage either of grain or water, and to the south of these is a large pit roughly hewn out of the rock, perhaps intended for prisoners as in Varugad. About fifty yards further east is a turret of considerable size the masonry of which is solid and on which a gun was planted. This turret stretches right across the fort but underneath it on the southern side is an archway about four feet high by two broad. But creeping through it is reached the eastern end which tapers off nearly to a point. The fort is about a hundred yards long by forty wide. The walls are about five or six feet high and the masonry, except the top layer, is in fair preservation. At the east end is one, and at the west end are two bastions at the north-west and south-west angles. Originally all three were crowned with guns and there are still remains of parapets on them. On the east bastion is a small stone placed erect for a ling and worshipped as the image of the god Jajarnath Mahadev. A small fair is held in honour of the god and the existence of this shrine explains how the path up to the fort is in good order. There is also a ruined building of loose stones near the south-west bastion in honour of some Muhammedan saint or pir.

== History ==
Mahimangad is expressly mentioned as one of the chain forts built by Chhatrapati Shivaji Maharaj to guard his eastern frontier. But some of the local residents declare that the fort existed in Musalman times and point to the pir shrine as evidence. This shrine however proves nothing since there are many such unfortified hills with shrines. The masonry is characteristic of the later built forts of Maratha times consisting of small, almost or altogether, uncut stones bound by mortar usually poor but, at the bastions and entrance, of good sound quality. On the same spur about a hundred yards east of the fort is a hill which barely commands it and is connected with it by a neck of the spur. The hamlets at the feet are not walled or protected in any way so that the approach within 250 feet of the top must have been easy enough. To escalade it however must have; been difficult though at the south-east corner by no means impossible. The hereditary garrison consisted of about seventy-five Ramoshis and Mahars who held the gadkari inam lands. The fort had lands assigned for it. The havaldar or former commander of the garrison is now the patil and the sabnis or accountant is the Kulkarni of the lands which are for purposes of administration as a distinct village called by the name of the fort.
