= Ninam, Satara =

Village in Maharashtra

श्री क्षेत्र निनाम.
- Village
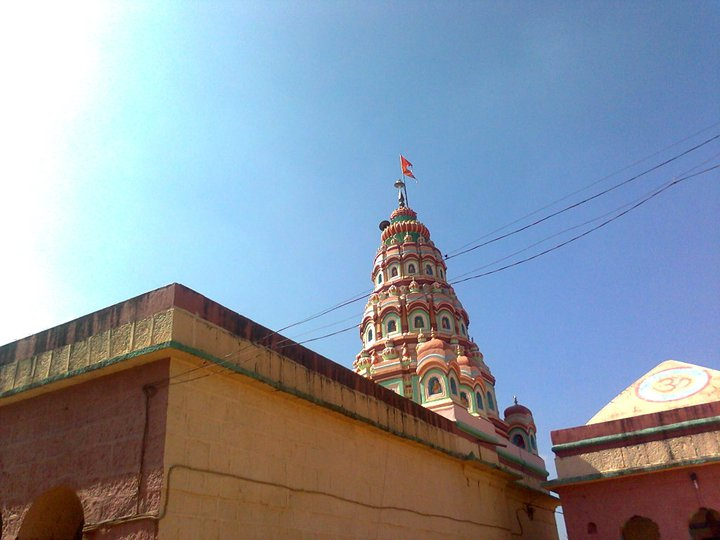
- Jotiba Temple, Ninam

- Location in Maharashtra, India
- Coordinates: 17.6711°N 74.0138°E
- Country: India
- State: Maharashtra
- District: Satara

Population (2011)
  - Total: 4,000
- Demonym: इनाम

Languages
  - Official: Marathi
- Time zone: UTC+5:30 (IST)
- PIN: 415519
- Area code: 02162
- Vehicle registration: MH-11
- Nearest city: Satara
- Lok Sabha constituency: Satara
- Vidhan Sabha constituency: Karad, North
- Avg. summer temperature: 30 °C (86 °F)
- Avg. winter temperature: 20 °C (68 °F)

Ninam is a census village in Satara district, in the Indian state of Maharashtra. It is a village surrounded by greenery and farms but also mountains. Agriculture is the main land use in the village with more than 75% of the total area being used for agricultural activities. The village close to historic Ajinkyatara fort, which is to the north. The large Jyotirlinga temple is in the center of the village.

== Geography ==
Sonapur (3 kilometres (1.9 mi)), Mandave (4.5 kilometres (2.8 mi)), Padali (3.3 kilometres (2.1 mi)), Dolegaon (4.3 kilometres (2.7 mi)), Bhatmarali (5 kilometres (3.1 mi)), Kusavade (4.5 kilometres (2.8 mi)), are nearby villages.

Ninam is bordered by Satara Taluka on the north, Satara and Karad talukas on the south, Koregaon Taluka on the east, and Patan Taluka on the west.

Ninam is located 23 kilometres (14 mi) south of the district headquarters Satara, 46 kilometres (29 mi) from Karad, and 266 kilometres (165 mi) from the state capital, Mumbai. Wai (50 kilometres (31 mi)) and Mahabaleswar (69 kilometres (43 mi)) are other nearby cities.

=== Nearby districts ===
- Pune – 123 kilometres (76 mi)
- Sangli – 116 kilometres (72 mi)
- Kolhapur – 120 kilometres (75 mi)
- Raigad – 195 kilometres (121 mi)
- Ratnagiri – 185 kilometres (115 mi)

== Climate and rainfall ==
The climate in general is moderate, with temperatures during the summer months (March to mid-June) reaching a maximum of 34 °C (93 °F), and in the winter months (November to March) dropping to 12 °C (54 °F). The climate is usually pleasant during the summer, but it is very cold during the monsoon, which starts in June with maximum precipitation in July and August. Annual rainfall is 3,104 millimetres (122.2 in).

By comparison, the Sahyadri hill ranges – chiefly in Mahabaleshwar tahsil, in the western extremity – receive more than 6,000 millimetres (240 in). Patan and Jawali tahsils have rainfall in excess of 2,000 millimetres (79 in). Moving eastwards the rainfall amount drops to less than 600 millimetres (24 in) in Koregaon, Karad, and Satara tahsils.

== Demographics ==
As of the 2011 Indian census, Ninam has population of 2,865 in 650 households, of which 1,389 are males (48.5%) and 1,476 are females (51.5%), for a female-to-male sex ratio of 1.06, which is higher than the Maharashtra state average of 0.93.

In Ninam, the population of children ages 0–6 is 308, which is 10.8% of the total population. The child sex ratio for Ninam is 0.83, lower than Maharashtra average of 0.89.

Ninam has a higher literacy rate compared to Maharashtra as a whole. In 2011, the literacy rate of Ninam village was 86.5%, compared to 82.3% for Maharashtra. The male literacy rate is 92.1%, and the female literacy rate is 81.4%.

Schedule Caste (SC) constitutes 9.8%, while Schedule Tribe (ST) were 0.8% of total population in Ninam village.

Marathi is the local language. The village incorporates people from all castes, mainly Hindu, Maratha, which include Brahman, Naik, Davari, Lohar, Shimpi, Nhavi, Sonar, Matang, Parit, Mali, Kasar, Chamber, and Boudhh. Two clans prominent in Ninam are the Jadhav and Mahadik. Other surname clans include Kadam, Kanase, Salunke, Yewale, Dhane, Pawar, and Nikam.

== Administration ==
Ninam is a village in Satara Taluka, in Satara District, of Maharashtra, India. It is in Desh, or Paschim, Maharashtra region and Pune division.

The postal code is 415519 and the post office is Padali (Satara).

As per the Constitution of India and the Panchayati Raj act, Ninam village is administered by an elected sarpanch (Head of Village)

== Economy ==
The village's economy relies mainly on agriculture, and its people are farmers of long standing; but most of the younger generation work in the design field, in MEP and architecture. More than 200 draughtsmen currently work in Mumbai, Pune, and Arab states of the Persian Gulf. Others work in politics, the Indian army, government administration, and education.

Major crops are:

- (irrigated): rice, wheat, Chickpea, sugarcane (ऊस, Ūsa), and peanuts, with growing seasons of 5 to 6 months (except sugarcane, which has a 10-to-12-month growing season).
- (non-irrigated): sorghum (jowar) as both Kharif (monsoon to autumn) and Rabi (winter to spring) crops, as well as peanuts, with growing seasons of 3 to 4 months.
- (cash crops): ginger (for ale) and sugarcane, with growing seasons of 10 to 12 months.
- fodder and mixed planting take place throughout the year.

There is widespread cultivation of fruits such as mangoes, bananas, Coconut and Chikoo, and the cultivation of flowers such as Rose, Tagetes, Gerbera, Dianthus caryophyllus, and Chrysanthemum.

=== Dams and irrigation projects ===
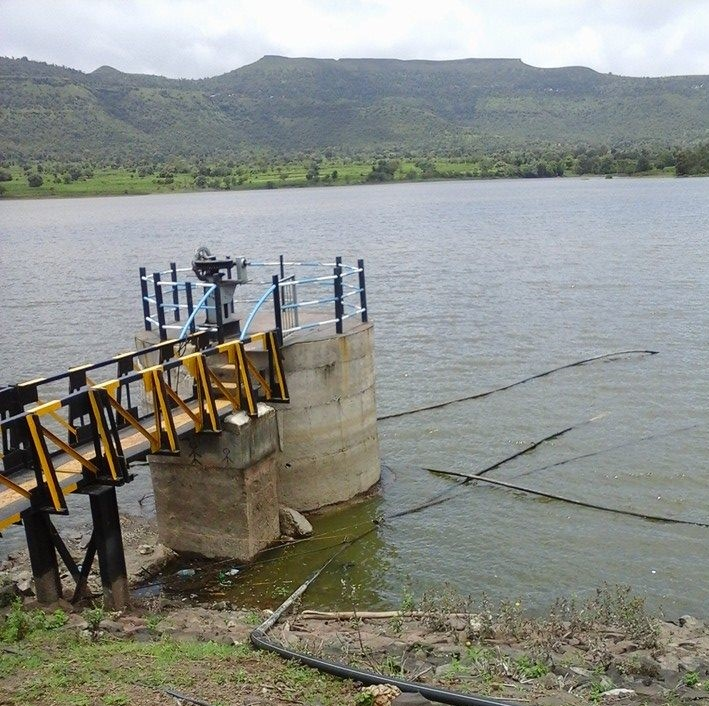
Mandave Dam (मांडवे धरण)

The village has one dam, Mandave Dam, at the boundary of Ninam and Mandave villages. The dam's reservoir has a capacity of 0.42 Tmcft and supplies water for agricultural irrigation. Some farmers electrically pump water from the dam's reservoir, while others use well water.

=== Soil ===
Black cotton soil is the predominant soil type, as is the case with most of the districts on the Deccan Plateau. Lateritic soil—which covers many parts of the western tahsils of Satara, Mahabaleshwar, Javali, Wai, and Patan—is typically clayey in nature and reddish in color. Soil fertility is especially high in village farms.

== Transport ==
=== Roads ===
Ninam Village is well connected to the rest of Maharashtra by road. National Highway 4 (India), from Mumbai to Chennai, passes through Nagathane, about 8 kilometres (5.0 mi) from the village. A bypass was constructed in the 1990s to avoid traffic congestion in the village, which is connected to other nearby villages by small roads.

== Nearby railway stations ==
- Targaon railway station – 23 kilometres (14 mi)
- Satara railway station – 35 kilometres (22 mi)
- Pune Junction railway station – 125 kilometres (78 mi)

== Nearest airports ==
- Karad Airport – 44 kilometres (27 mi)
- Kolhapur Airport – 117 kilometres (73 mi)
- Pune Airport – 134 kilometres (83 mi)
- Solapur Airport – 238 kilometres (148 mi)
- Chhatrapati Shivaji Maharaj International Airport – 276 kilometres (171 mi)
- Chhatrapati Sambhaji Raje International Airport – Coming Soon

== Education ==
Nearby engineering colleges

- A.B.I.T Polytechnic Shahunagar Shendre, Satara
- Satara Polytechnic, Satara Khindwadi Satara
- K.B.P. Polytechnic, Panmalevadi varied Satara
- Gourishankar Polytechnic, Limb Khind Satara
- Government Engineering College, Vidhyanagar Karad
- Satara College of Pharmacy Degaon, Satara

Other colleges

- Chhatrapari Shivaji Art College, Satara
- Dhanjay Gadagil Commerce College, Satara
- Yashwantrao Chavan Science College, Satara
- L.B.S. College, Satara
- Ismailsaheb Mulla Law College, Satara

Nearby schools

- Z.P. Primary School Ninam
- T.B.D. English School & Jr. College, Padali (Ninam)
- Shri Ramkrishna Vidhya Mandir & Jr. College, Nagathane
- Maharaja Sayajirao Vidyalaya & Jr. College, Satara
- Annasaheb Kalyani Vidyalaya, Satara
- Sainik School Satara

== Temples ==
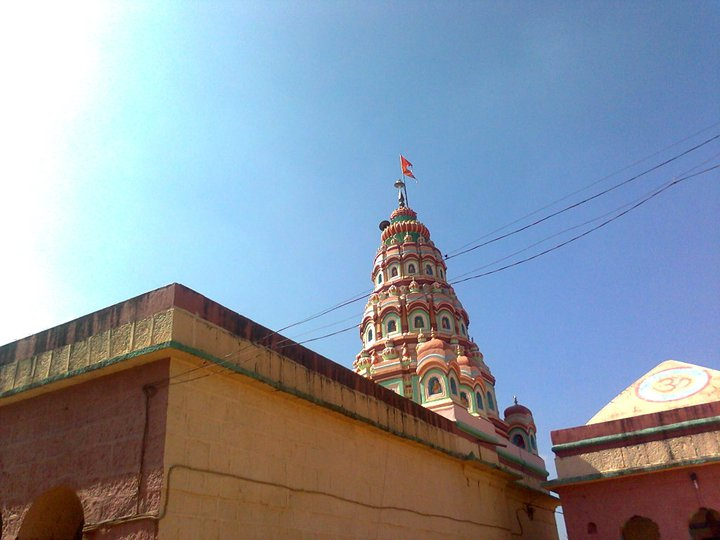
Jyotiba Temple, Ninam

Jyotiba Temple is situated at the center of Ninam Village. According to tradition, the original Jyotirling Temple was replaced, in 1730, by the present temple. The shrine is spacious. The temple, including the spire, is surrounded by a strong 15-foot-high wall. Near the north side of Jyotirling Temple is Hanuman temple.

The second temple of Jalav Jyotiba is situated in Jyotirling Nagar (Ninam), about 600 meters from the village's western border. This shrine was constructed in 2010. The interior of the temple is newly constructed but looks ancient. There are other temples and light-towers on the premises.

There are many other temples in Ninam: Lakshmi mata, Bhavani mata, Shiva, Dattatreya, Vithoba, Rukmini, Rama, Lakshmana, and Sita temples.

=== Festivals ===
On Hanuman Jayanti, an important festival in the Hindu calendar, a big fair is held. Villagers often go to Wadi Ratnagiri in Kolhapur district to celebrate. After the completion of the Wadi Ratnagiri fair, all devotees attending that fair would bring back tall sasan sticks to the Ninam village fair, in time for prayer. A first-place sasan-stick prize is awarded by the village.

The deity of the temple is known by the same name, and is held by the locals to be an incarnation of three gods: Brahma, Vishnu, Mahesha, and Jamadagni. The fair takes place annually on the night of the full moon of the Hindu months of Chaitra and Vaishakha. Due to the scattering of gulal, an entire mountain is turned pink. Being that Sunday is the day dedicated to Jyotiba, there is a rush of people.

== Cuisine ==
The cuisine is usually very spicy and includes Bhakri, rice, Harbara (i.e. Gram), Dal, and vegetables such as Fenugreek and Brinjal. Non-vegetarians prefer mutton, chicken, and eggs. Other foods are papads especially made of Sago for fasting and Kharda (खरडा), a ground green chili-paste chutney fried with onion and garlic paste. Kanda Bhaji, Misal, vada pav and Bhel are some of the favorite breakfast snacks. Kandi Peda is for people who have a sweet tooth, as is locally made Sevai served with hot milk and jaggery as a local dessert. Eating groundnuts boiled in hot salted water and sun-dried is a favorite local pastime. Chakulya (चकुल्या)—a local delicacy made of wheat flour strips cut, put into a spicy dal, and served with rice and some Ghee—is only found here.

== Tourist attractions ==
- Pandavghal – 1 kilometre (0.62 mi)
- Patil Wada – 4 kilometres (2.5 mi)
- Satara – 18 kilometres (11 mi)
- Sajjangad – 19 kilometres (12 mi)
- Thoseghar Waterfalls – 27 kilometres (17 mi)
- Kaas Plateau – 35 kilometres (22 mi) (Called "Valley of flowers of Maharashtra" and is a World Heritage Site.)
- Chalake Wadi – 28 kilometres (17 mi)
- Shri Bhavani Museum, Aundh, Satara – 52 kilometres (32 mi)
- Panchgani – 67 kilometres (42 mi)
- Mahabaleshwar – 69 kilometres (43 mi)
- Koyna Dam – 77 kilometres (48 mi)

== Forts ==
- Ajinkyatara – 17 kilometres (11 mi)
- Sajjangad – 19 kilometres (12 mi)
