= Vele, Satara =

Village in Maharashtra

Vele (Satara)
- Village
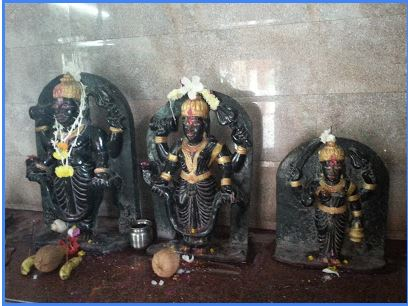
- Idol of Lord Bhairava in Vele(वेळे)

- Location in Maharashtra, India Vele (Satara) (India)
- Coordinates: 17.7307899°N 73.879457°E
- Country: India
- State: Maharashtra
- District: Satara

Government
  - Body: Gram panchayat

Languages
  - Official: Marathi
- Time zone: UTC+5:30 (IST)
- PIN: 415 022
- Telephone code: 02162
- Vehicle registration: MH-11
- Website: maharashtra.gov.in

Vele is a village in the Western region of Maharashtra state in India. It is located in the Satara district of Maharashtra. Before it was a part of Bombay State and Princely state of Satara. It is located adjacent to Kanher Dam built on Venna River. There is a big temple of Bhairava at the village entrance. Also there are number of temples in closed vicinity of village. Surrounded by greenery and farms, agriculture is the main occupation in the village with more than 80% of the total area being used for agricultural activities. Though agriculture constitutes a mainstay of the economy of this village, besides a sizeable population working at various plum government positions does bolster the financial position.

== History ==
The village was established on banks of Venna River by the Maratha Shinde clan who were hereditary Deshmukh and had received a hereditary Desmukhi Watan Inam of Vele (Marathi: वेळे) during the pre-Shivaji era. As per the current available documents Sidhoji Shinde was the founder of Shinde family of Vele. Descendants of Sidhoji continue to stay in Vele and Satara. Hereditary Administrative rights of Peteshwar devasthan located near to village on Kaas plateau road belonged to Shinde Deshmukh family.

== Demographics ==
The official language is Marathi (Marathi: मराठी) with its own dialect. Language varies in its tone and a few words. People from all castes which include Maratha (Marathi: मराठा), Hindu-teli(तेली), Mang, Boudhh, Chambar, Mali, Lohar, Shimpi, Kosthi etc., live here. Maratha comprise the majority of the population. Clan prominent in Vele (Marathi: वेळे) is Shinde (Marathi: शिंदे).

Religions in Vele
| Religion | Percent |
| Hindus | 85% |
| Muslims | 5% |
| Others† | 10% |
Distribution of religions

== Geography and Climate ==
Vele (Marathi: वेळे) belongs to Desh or Paschim Maharashtra region and to Pune Division. It is located 15 km from district headquarters Satara. Nearby villages are Kamthi, Vennanagar and Kanher.

The climate is tropical monsoons as it receives a heavy rainfall during the monsoon season with the summers being hot and winters being chilly. The average temperature during the winters can range from 9 deg C to 25 deg C.

== Education, infrastructure and development ==
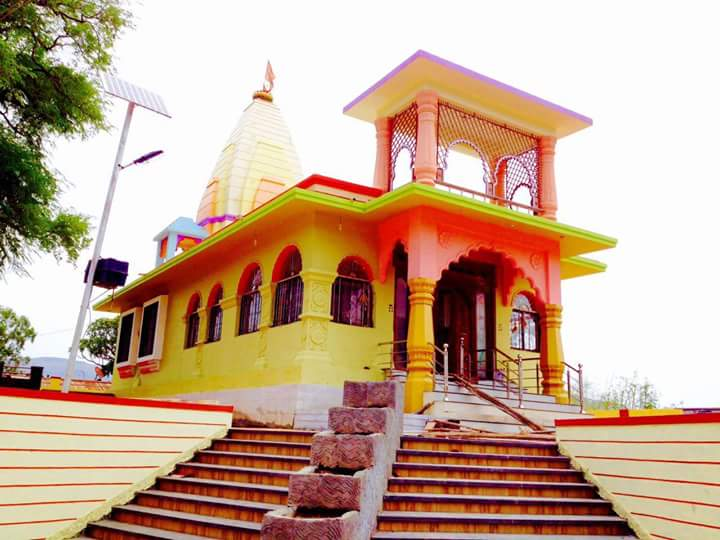
Lord Bhairava Temple at वेळे

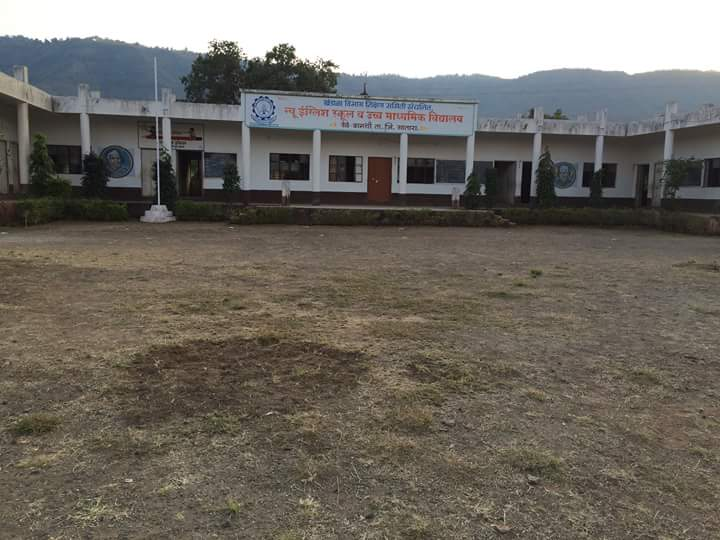
School in Vele

Vele (Marathi: वेळे) has long tradition for education. It has Marathi High School which was established during British Raj, this was the school where many prominent persons from Vele (Marathi: वेळे) took their early education. Presently, village has education facility of both Marathi and Semi-English schools.

=== Library ===
Villagers of Vele(Dnyanganga Sarvajanik Vachala) (Marathi: वेळे) set up a Public library in the ancestral house of Shinde Family in village, with the thought of offering kids of village something which they had never experienced before. Although the initiative saw a mere participation initially, but the number tremendously rose to a regular visit of students in a year's time. Setting up a library helped in achieving many things like students of different backgrounds come together to read, study and interact under the same roof. Library covers a vast range of books; newspapers, weekly and monthly magazines. The students and also villagers are free to read as per their choice.

== Dams and irrigation projects ==
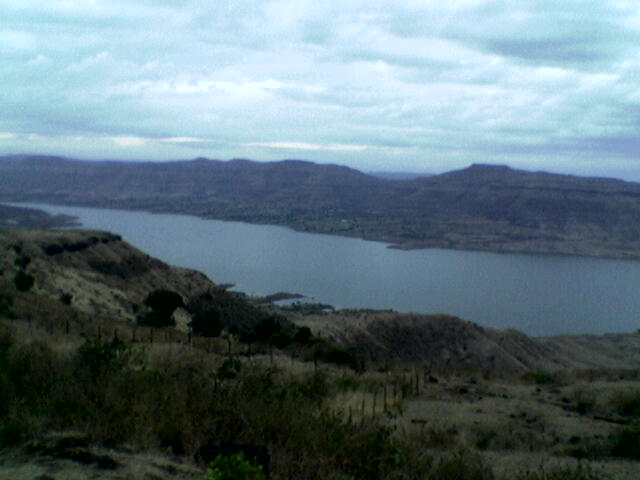
Kanher Dam in vicinity of Vele

The village (Marathi: वेळे) has one dam named Kanher Dam. Almost all the villagers of Vele (Marathi: वेळे) donated their fertile agricultural land which they had owned for generations, for construction of Kanher Dam around 40 years ago (1970s). River on which this dam is built is the Venna River. The height of the dam above lowest foundation is 50.34 m (165.2 ft) while the length is 1,954 m (6,411 ft). The volume content is 6,308 km^{3} (1,513 mi^{3}) and gross storage capacity is 286,000 km^{3} (69,000 mi^{3}).

== Agricultural and cropping pattern ==
Black cotton soil is the predominant soil type found here as is the case with most of the districts on the Deccan Plateau.

Major crops (irrigated) are rice, Cotton, Wheat, Gram, Sugarcane, Groundnut for 5 to 6 months (Except Sugar cane).

Major crops (non irrigated) are Bajra, Kharif and Rabi, Jowar, Groundnut for 3 to 4 months.

== Notable people ==
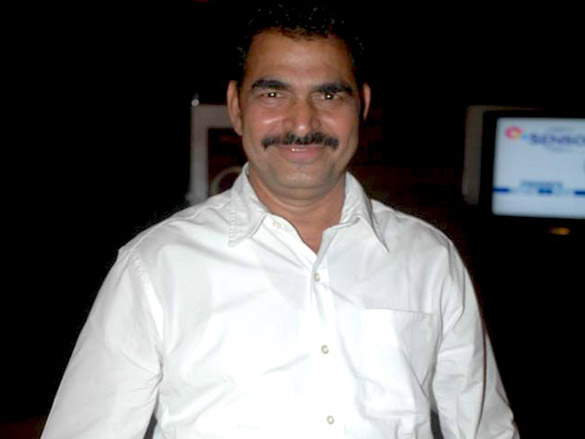
Sayaji Shinde

Vele (Marathi: वेळे) is the birthplace of Indian film actor- Sayaji Shinde (Marathi: सयाजी शिंदे) who has acted in Telugu, Marathi, Hindi, Tamil, Kannada, and Malayalam films. From early child Sayaji Shinde faced the challenges of life. Electricity reached this village as late as 1981.

== Transport ==
=== Road ===
Vele (Marathi: वेळे) is located about 15 km from Satara, 122 km from Pune and around 270 km from Mumbai, the state capital. The nearest major city is Satara. Bus services by state-run MSRTC and private organizations connect Vele (Marathi: वेळे) by jeeps from Satara. Medha and Mahabaleshwar are the nearby towns having good connectivity.

=== Rail ===
Satara railway station, Jarandeshwar Railway Station (near to Satara) are the railway stations reachable from Vele. However Pune Junction railway station is major railway station 135 km from here.

== Nearby ==
=== Tourist places ===
- Kanher Dam - 4.7 km
- Satara - 15 km
- Ajinkyatara - 20 km
- Sajjangad - 29 km
- Kaas Plateau- 38 km, Called "Valley of flowers of Maharashtra" which is also a World Heritage Site
- Baramotichi Vihir- Stepwell near Limb village which is about 25 km from Vele
- Thoseghar Waterfalls - 39 km
- Mahableshwar - 49 km
- Panchgani - 48 km
- Shri Chhatrapati Shivaji Maharaj Museum, Satara - 15 km
- Shri Bhavani Museum, Aundh, Satara - 57 km

=== Airports ===
- Pune Airport - 131 km
- Kolhapur Airport - 142 km
- Chhatrapati Shivaji Maharaj International Airport - 274 km

=== Colleges ===
- Yashwantrao Chavan Institute of Science college, Satara
- Karmaveer Bhaurao Patil College Of Engineering, Satara
- Government College of Engineering, Karad
- Chhatrapati Shivaji Arts College, Satara

=== Districts ===
- Satara - 15 km
- Pune – 120 km

== See also ==
- History of Maharashtra
- Kanher Dam
- Shinde
