= Yerad =

Village in Maharashtra

Coordinates: 17.3636°N 73.8560°E

Yerad is a village in the Patan Taluka, Satara District in the Maharashtra state of India. Yerad is located 6.2 km distance from its Taluka main town, Patan. Yerad is 39.4 km from its District Main City Satara. It is 215 km from its State Main City Mumbai.

Nearby villages to Yerad are Nerale (1.9 km), Tamkade (2.1 km), Zakade (2.4 km), Tolewadi (2.4 km), Manyachiwadi (2.5 km). Nearby towns are Karad (27.7 km), Satara (41 km), Jawali (50.9 km).

According to the government census, in 1941 there were about 900 people living in Yerad. This has now grown to about 1,100. There is a stone temple in the village and a grove of mango trees. For many years an annual week long fair has attracted over 10,000 visitors, at times causing pollution problems.

In 1967 some of the buildings in the village were damaged by an earthquake.
