= Bacholi =

Village in Maharashtra

Coordinates: 24°31′N 76°18′E

- Village
- Interactive map of Bacholi
- Country: India
- State: Maharashtra
- District: Satara district
- Talukas: Patan

Languages
  - Official: Marathi
- Time zone: UTC+5:30 (IST)

Bacholi is a village in Satara district in the southern state of Maharashtra, India.
