= Tirthkshetra Padali =

Village in Maharashtra

Tirthkshetra Padali, Satara is a village located in the Satara (Tehsil & District) of Maharashtra state of India. Tirthkshetra Padali village is surrounded by Urmodi river. The village is near the historic Ajinkyatara fort, which is situated on the north side of Tirthkshetra Padali. Jotiba is a popular deity in the Padali, and the Jotiba festival is a major annual celebration that takes place in honor of this deity. Also The festival is celebrated in various parts of Maharashtra, including the cities of Kolhapur and Satara.

The Jotiba festival typically takes place in the month of Chaitra (March/April), and it is a multi-day celebration that includes various rituals and cultural events. The festival is marked by processions of devotees who carry the idol of Jotiba on a palanquin, accompanied by music and dancing. The procession typically makes its way to the Jotiba temple, where the deity is offered prayers and offerings.

During the festival, devotees also perform various rituals and offerings, such as offering coconuts, lighting incense, and singing devotional songs. The festival is a time of great joy and celebration, and it is an important part of the cultural heritage of Maharashtra.

== Festival (YATRA) ==
Tirthkshetra Padali yatra fall in Month of April on Sankashti Chaturthi mostly 3-4 day after Jyotirlinga chaitra yatra Kolhapur.

As per tradition, every Sasan Kathi is ranked from 1 to 108 and out of 108, nearly 40 - 50 Sasan Kathi's are arrived in Jyotiba temple for Chaitra Yatra in Wadi Ratnagiri. The first rank of the Sasan Kathi has been given to Tirthkshetra Padali village (after the year 1896).

Sasan Kathi's are the biggest attraction of the Yatra. On the day of yatra, when all sasan kathi's arrived at the temple, proper invitation awarded to Tirthkshetra Padali village via Bhaldar from Paschim Maharashtra Devasthan Samiti (PMDS).

== Education ==
Primary school

ZILLA PARISHAD MARATHI SCHOOL

High school

ENGLISH SCHOOL AND TANAJI BANDU DHANE JUNIOR COLLEGE OF ARTS PADALI NINAM

== Sports ==
Cricket

- Divyashakti Cricket club Padali
- Speed Cricket Club, Padali

== Nearest Tourism ==
- Ajinkyatara
- Kas Plateau Reserved Forest
- Mahabaleshwar
- Sajjangad
- Pratapgad
