= Ghot, Satara =

Village in Maharashtra

Ghot village is located in western Maharashtra. It is surrounded by Sahyadri. Ghot is about 32 km away from its district capital Satara. It belongs to Patan taluka. Ghot is about 27 km away from Patan. In the 2011 Census of India, Ghot had a population of 1,198.
