= Varugad =

Fort in India

Varugad Fort
- Satara District, Maharashtra, India

Site information
- Owner: Government of India
- Open to the public: Yes

Location
- India
- Coordinates: 17.8531038°N 74.4416478°E

Varugad Fort (Man T; 18 00' N, 74 00' E; RS Lonand 22 m. NW; p. 880), in Man lies, as the crow flies, about twelve miles north-west of Dahivadi, within the limits of Panvan village. The hamlet is situated on a projection between the two ravines, and has been built on a hill of a truncated conical shape.

The hill rises about 250 feet above the level of the plateau, which itself constitutes the summit of the Mahadev range at this point. The cone with the walls on it is seen from a great distance and appears very small indeed. But on near approach it is seen to be but the inner citadel of a place of considerable size and strength for the times in which it was built. On the south-west the outer wall or enceinte is entered by a crude gateway of a single pointed arch about eight feet high and five feet broad. As usual there is a curtain of solid masonry inside. The gate lies about 150 yards east of the edge of the plateau, which there terminates in an almost unbroken vertical precipice of several hundred feet in height and receding in a north-easterly direction. No wall was built along about three hundred yards of this part which is absolutely unscalable, but for the rest of the way the walling is continued along the edge of the cliff in a north-east direction for about another three hundred yards. Here it turns still following the cliff to the south-east for another seven hundred yards, and then gradually rounds to the westward covering four hundred and fifty yards more till it meets the gateway. But for the break of the inaccessible precipice this outer wall would form a nearly equilateral triangle with the corners rounded off, the side being of some six hundred and fifty yards. Facing nearly north, about fifty yards from the north-east angle, is a gateway with a couple of curtains in solid masonry. This entrance is cut in the sides of the cliff about twenty feet below the top which is reached by some dozen steps. It consisted as usual of a pointed arch, the top fallen in, about ten feet high by five broad. It leads out to the path down to Girvi, a village in the plains below and it probably formed the communication with Phaltan. This road winds down the face of the range for some five hundred feet till it hits the shoulder of a spur which it then follows to the base. The walling on the south side, from the edge of the cliff to some hundred yards east of the southern gate, is not more than a couple of feet in thickness and consists of all-fitted stone unmortared. The rest is massive and well mortared and still fairly preserved. The average height is from seven to ten feet. In the southeast angle is a crude temple of Bhairavnath and the remains of a few houses in Man. On the right side of the southern gate is a well preserved stone pond about thirty yards square with steps leading down to it. Next to and on the north of the Bhairavnath Temple is another pond. The way up to the fort proper or upper and lower citadels is from the north side. The path up the hill side is steep but with grass and soil in many places, but is almost destroyed. About 150 feet up is the outer citadel built on a sort of shoulder of the hill and facing almost due west. It contains two massive bastions of excellent masonry looking north-west and south-west so that guns on them command the north and south gateways. This citadel was connected with the main wall by a cross wall running along the whole breadth of the fort from east to west. Its entrance lies close below that to the upper citadel. A masonry curtain projects so as to hide the arch itself, which is not more than seven feet high by three broad, and has to be entered from due east. On the south side the walls are carried right up to the scarp of the upper citadel and are some ten feet high, so that to take the lower citadel in rear or flank must have been difficult. The upper citadel is above a vertical scarp some thirty feet high. The entrance to it lies some thirty feet above that to the lower citadel, and is cut in the rock about eight feet wide. There is a gateway with a pointed arch with the top fallen in and twenty odd steps leading up to it and ten more cut out of the rock, and winding up past the inside curtain on to the top. The walls of this upper citadel are still in tolerable preservation. They were originally about ten feet high and built of fair masonry. There is a large turret on the south-west corner, evidently meant to command the southern gate. About ten yards to the east of this turret is a new looking building which was the sadar (headquarters). Immediately east of this and below it is a great pit about thirty feet square and equally deep roughly cut in the rock and said by the people to be a dungeon. Next to it on the south is a small pond evenly cut and lined with mortar used for storing water. There are some remains of sepoys' houses, and, near the turret, a small stone wheel said to belong to a gun. The outer walls east of the gates have bastions at every turn of the cliffs, and the masonry here is particularly strong and well preserved. It would appear that attacks were dreaded chiefly from the plain below. The assailants could either come up the spur towards the north entrance or they might attempt the spurs on the other side of the eastern ravine and attack the southern gateway. Hence apparently the reason for strengthening the walls of the enceinte on this side. After passing the southern gateway, the assailants would be shot at from the lower citadel. They would then encounter the cross wall. If that obstacle was overcome, the besieged would run round the east side and into the two citadels. The appearance from the fort of the plain in the north is most formidable.

The Panvan plateau completely commands and indeed almost overhangs it. The fort is believed to have been built by Shivaji to resist the Moghals whose attacks he must have dreaded from the plain below. The Karkhanis or Superintendent of the fort was a Prabhu. The fort garrison consisted of 200 Ramoshis, Mahars, and other hereditary Gadkaris besides Sepoys. It was surrendered in 1818 to Vitthal Pant Phadnis of the Raja of Satara, left in charge of the town. He detached 200 men to take possession, being part of a force then raised to protect the town from the attack by Bajirav's garrisons then in the neighbourhood.
