= Sonake =

Village in Maharashtra

Sonake is a village in Koregaon Taluka of Satara district in Maharashtra state, India.
