= Ninam =

Ninam may refer to:

- Ninam language a language of Brazil and Venezuela
- Ninam, Satara, a village in Maharashtra, India
