= Kondhwali =

Kondhawali is a town in Satara District, near Mahabaleshwar in Maharashtra, India.

It is considered as the birthplace of Jiva Mahale (bodyguard of Shivaji 1).

Population is around 700-800 people. It is surrounded by the Krishna River on 2 sides.

Special Highlights

1. Kamalgad
2. Krishna River
3. Ram Krishna Hari Ashram

== Temples ==
There Are 5 Major temples in the village

1. Shree Bhairavanaath Temple
2. Hanuman Temple
3. Shree Datta Mandir
4. Siddheshwar Mandir
5. Gorakshanath Mandir
