= Jakhangaon =

Village in Maharashtra

- Village
- Location in Maharashtra, India
- Coordinates: 17.64718°N 74.31626°E
- Country: India
- State: Maharashtra
- District: Satara
- Taluka: Khatav

Government
  - Body: Gram Panchayat

Population (2011)
  - Total: 2,142

Languages
  - Official: Marathi
- Time zone: UTC+5:30 (IST)
- PIN: 415505
- ISO 3166 code: IN-MH
- Vehicle registration: MH-11
- Nearest city: Satara
- Lok Sabha constituency: Satara
- Vidhan Sabha constituency: Koregaon
- Civic agency: Gram Panchayat
- Website: maharashtra.gov.in

Jakhangaon is a village in the Khatav Taluka (subdistrict) of the Satara district in the Indian state Maharashtra. Jakhangaon's village-deity is Bhairavnath. 60-70% of Jakhandgaon's land is irrigated. The famous Aundh Tirthakshetra is about 13 km from here. This holy place has the temple of Yamaai Devi. Sevagiri Maharaj's temple is situated at 10 km north of Jakhangaon in Pusegaon.
