= Andrud =

Village in Maharashtra

- village
- Location within Maharashtra Location within India
- Coordinates: 17.883061°N 74.629210°E
- Country: India
- State: Maharashtra
- District: Satara
- Taluka: Phaltan
- Postal code: 415523

Andrud is a small village in Phaltan, Satara district, Maharashtra, India. The majority of the population is involved in agriculture, and working as drivers and doing physical works in Mumbai and Pune.
