= Jihe =

Village in Maharashtra

- Village
- Location in Maharashtra, India Jihe (India)
- Coordinates: 17°37′N 74°09′E
- Country: India
- State: Maharashtra
- District: Satara

Population (2001)
  - Total: 1,845

Languages
  - Official: Marathi
- Time zone: UTC+5:30 (IST)
- PIN: 415 004
- Telephone code: 91 2162

Jihe is a village in Satara district, Maharashtra, India. It is situated on the banks of Krishna River, approximately 15 km away from Satara, a city in Satara district. Jihe is approached using the Rahimatpur Road.
