= Godoli =

- Census town
- Interactive map of Godoli
- Location in Maharashtra, India
- Coordinates: 17.6711°N 74.0138°E
- Country: India
- State: Maharashtra
- District: Satara

Population (2001)
  - Total: 16,751

Languages
  - Official: Marathi
- Time zone: UTC+5:30 (IST)

Godoli is a census town in Satara district in the Indian state of Maharashtra.

== Demographics ==
As of 2001 India census, Godoli had a population of 16,751. Males constitute 52% of the population and females 48%. Godoli has an average literacy rate of 83%, higher than the national average of 59.5%: male literacy is 85%, and female literacy is 81%. In Godoli, 11% of the population is under 6 years of age.
