= Adarki =

Village in Maharashtra, India

Coordinates: 17°55′N 74°13′E

Adarki is a village in Phaltan Taluka in the Satara District of Maharashtra State, India. At the 2011 census, the village had a population of 2704.
