= Mane (clan) =

Maratha Clan found in Maharashtra, Karnataka, India

The Mane also called (Gārudā माने Rāṣṭrakūṭa), is a Maratha clan found largely in Maharashtra, Karnataka and neighbouring states of India.

== History ==
The Manes were holders of fiefs during Shivaji's time and considered themselves "loyal subjects" of Aurangzeb or Adil Shah.

== Notables ==
- Anant Mane, a Marathi film director.
- Srinivas Mane, Member Of The Karnataka Legislative Assembly from Hangal Constituency

== See also ==
- Maratha clan system
- Rashtrakuta Empire
- Maharatta tribe or region
- Marathi people
- Satara District

== Sources ==
=== English ===
4) Maratha Confederacy: A Study in Its Origin and Development By Vasant S. Kadam Published by Munshiram Manoharlal Publishers, 1993 Original from the University of Michigan Digitized 3 Sep 2008 ISBN 81-215-0570-4, 978-81-215-0570-3 158 pages

6) Proceedings of the Meetings of the Session By Indian Historical Records Commission Published by The Manager of Publications., 1971 Item notes: v. 41 Original from the University of Michigan Digitized 28 Aug 2008

7) Maharashtra State Gazetteers By Maharashtra (India), Maharashtra (India). Gazetteers Dept Edition: revised Published by Directorate of Govt. Print., Stationery and Publications, Maharashtra State, 1960 Item notes: v. 22 Original from the University of Michigan Digitized 3 Sep 2008

8) Bundelkhand under the Marathas, 1720–1818 A.D.: a study of Maratha-Bundela relations By B. R. Andhare Published by Vishwa Bharati Prakashan, 1984 Item notes: v. 1–2 Original from the University of Michigan Digitized 10 Nov 2006

9) Journal of Indian History By University of Kerala Dept. of History, University of Allahabad Dept. of Modern Indian History, University of Travancore, University of Kerala Published by Dept. of Modern Indian History, 1966 Item notes: v. 44 Original from the University of California Digitized 31 Jul 2008
