= Pateshwar =

Village in Maharashtra

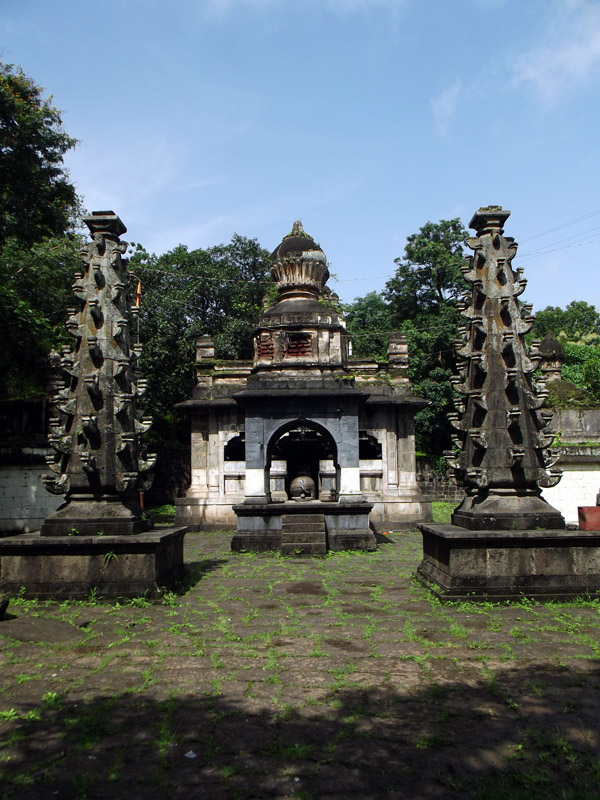
Pateshwar temple

Pateshwar is a village in Satara district of Maharashtra, known for rock-cut caves with shrines of Shiva.

Pateshwar is located about 11.26 km South East of Satara on the Satara-Kolhapur state highway in Maharashtra. While there are two ways of approaching Pateshwar, the most popular route is through Degaon village by State Transport buses, autorickshaws apart from private cars. The other route is from the South through a village called Borgaon. This road is preferred by the locals, however tourists prefer the Degaon route.

Pateshwar has 8 ancient caves and many ancient stone carved deities of Shiva and other deities. The place is known for having more than 1000 Shiva-lings (Also known as Pinds). Most important amongst these is the Maha Shiva Lingam which has intricate carvings. Many of the deities find references in the ancient Hindu Vedas and Puranas. Some of the identified deities are as below

== Shivalings ==
- Ekmukhdhari Pind
- Chaturmukhdhari Pind
- Ashtadikpal Pind
- Harihar Pind
- Margalmhaisa Pind
- Yantra Pind
- Kumbheshwara
- Sahastralinga

== Other Deities ==
- Ekmukhi Bramhadev
- Chaturmukh Shiv
- Saraswati
- Agni
- Sheshashayee Vishnu
- Vainayaki
- Tripura
- Ashtadashbhuja Mahishasur Mardini Chamunda
- Ashtamatruka
- Navgraha
- Dvadashavtar
- Balibhadra

Many of the deities are unique and have not been completely identified yet.

There is a mutth called 'Sadguru Govindanandswami Maharaj Mutt' which has few Sadhus who are known to take care of the place. However the temples are not in the best of condition and most of them have overgrown vegetation.

The hill has approximately 52 types of plants which have medicinal value and semi-deciduous trees like Teak, Banyan, Jamun, Karvee. Flowers like the Malabar Delphinium and Sonki which are found on the Kaas plateau in abundance are also found on this hill. The animals mostly found are monkeys, rat snakes, wild pigs and one can also sight Peacocks in the valley down below.

There is a book written by Shri Shankar Namdeo Barge in Satara on Pateshwar which is titled 'Shree Kshetra Pateshwar Darshan'
