= Kashil =

Village in Maharashtra

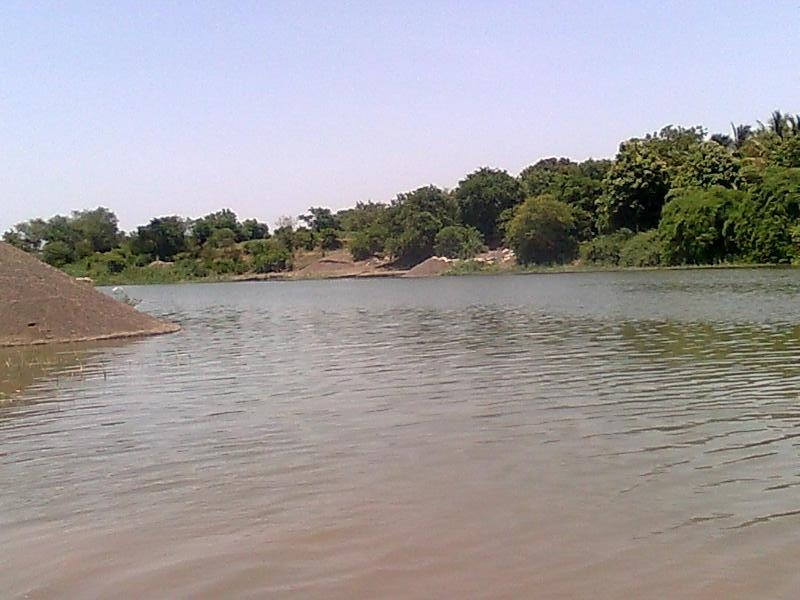
Krushna river at Kashil village

Kashil is a village in Satara District of Maharashtra state in Western India. It lies at the confluence of the Krishna River and the Urmodi River.

== How to reach Kashil ==
- By Road - Kashil lies on NH4 highway

MSRTC runs bus service from Satara and Karad. Kashil is exactly 26 km from both Satara and Karad.

== Nearby Cities ==
- Umbraj - 10 km
- Nagthane - 10 km
- Satara - 26 km
- Karad - 26 km
- Sangli - 95 km
- Kolhapur - 100 km
- Pune - 139 km

== Nearby villages ==
- Towards satara - Atit, Nagthane, Majgaon, Borgaon, Bharatgaon, Valase, Shendre, Satara
- Towards Karad - Perle, Indoli, Umbraj, Varhade, Tasawade, Wahagaon, Khodashi, Belawade, Karad
- On East - Nisrale, khodad, Koparde, Venegaon, Tukaiwadi, Sayli
- On West - Pali, Marli, Chore, Tarle

== Education in Kashil ==
There is a High School in Kashil named "Yashwant High School, Kashil". This school is run by Rayat Shikshan Sanstha which was established by Karmaveer Bhaurao Patil. This school have education up to 10th standard. For further education students choose Satara, Karad, Umbraj or Nagthane.
There are also four Primary Schools run by Satara ZP.

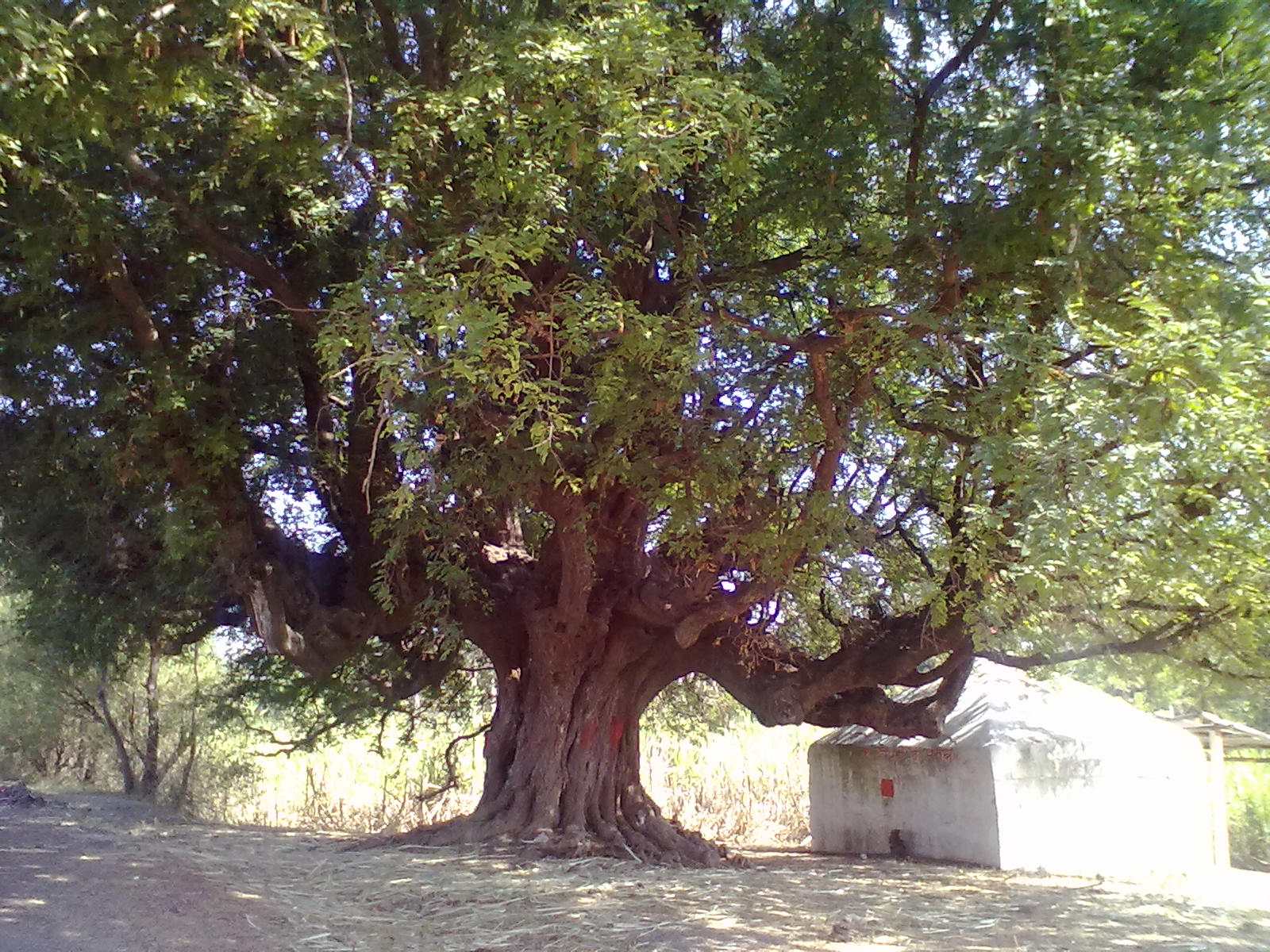
Old tree & temple of Chilawali Devi
