= Mahu, Jawali =

Village in Maharashtra

Mahu
- Village
- Location in Maharashtra, India Mahu (India)
- Coordinates: 17.885°N 73.815°E

Mahu is a village in Jawali tehsil. Mahu is a village panchayat located in the Satara district of Maharashtra state, India. The latitude 17.8847181 and longitude 73.81543940000009 are the geocordinates of the Mahu.
