= Karanje Turf Satara =

- Census town
- Location in Maharashtra, India
- Coordinates: 17.6999°N 73.9953°E
- Country: India
- State: Maharashtra
- District: Satara

Population (2001)
  - Total: 21,503

Languages
  - Official: Marathi
- Time zone: UTC+5:30 (IST)

Karanje Turf Satara is a census town in Satara district in the Indian state of Maharashtra.

== Demographics ==
As of 2001 India census, Karanje Turf Satara had a population of 21,503. Males constitute 53% of the population and females 47%. Karanje Turf Satara has an average literacy rate of 77%, higher than the national average of 59.5%: male literacy is 81%, and female literacy is 74%. In Karanje Turf Satara, 12% of the population is under 6 years of age.

The name is derived from being near the village of Karanje. It has adjoining areas in it.

The place is well known for 100 year old Mahanubhav Math. The ITI Satara is also located at Molacha Odha.

It is under development with colonies like Tamjai Nagar and has all facilities for shopping, schools and hospital care.

The Lumbini temple is a special attraction.
