= Kanher Dam =

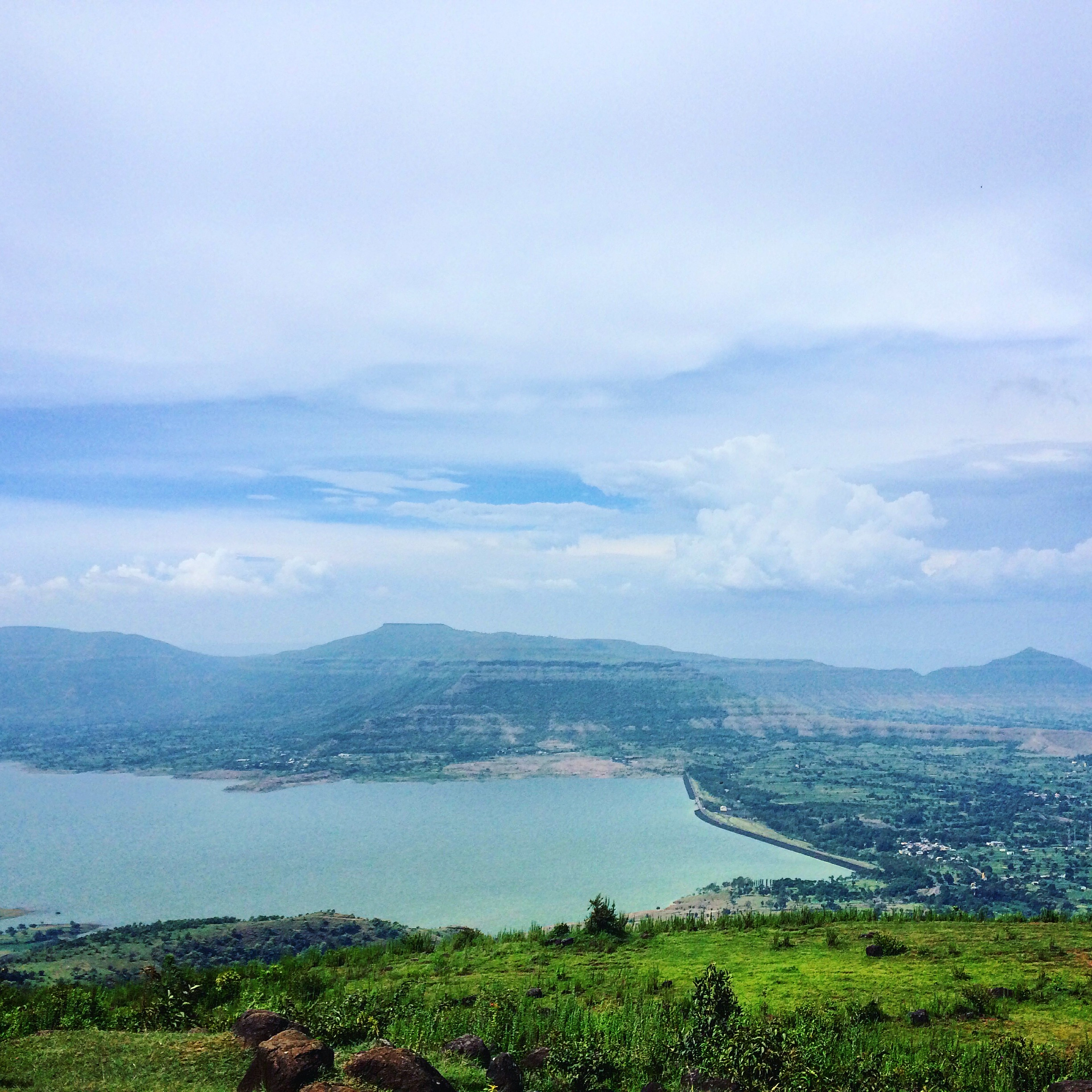
- From south

- Location within Maharashtra
- Official name: Kanher Dam
- Location: Satara
- Coordinates: 17°44′8″N 73°54′55″E
- Opening date: 1986
- Owners: Government of Maharashtra, India

Dam and spillways
- Type of dam: Earthfill; Gravity
- Impounds: Wenna river
- Height: 50.34 m (165.2 ft)
- Length: 1,954 m (6,411 ft)
- Dam volume: 6,308 km^{3} (1,513 cu mi)

Reservoir
- Total capacity: 271,680 km^{3} (65,180 cu mi)
- Surface area: 18.63 km^{2} (7.19 sq mi)

Kanher Dam, is an earthfill and gravity dam on Wenna river near Satara in state of Maharashtra in India.

== Specifications ==
The height of the dam above lowest foundation is 50.34 m (165.2 ft) while the length is 1,954 m (6,411 ft). The volume content is 6,308 km^{3} (1,513 cu mi) and gross storage capacity is 286,000.00 km^{3} (68,615.05 cu mi).

== Purpose ==
- Irrigation
- Hydroelectricity

== See also ==
- Dams in Maharashtra
- List of reservoirs and dams in India
