= Gharewadi =

Village in Maharashtra

Gharewadi is a village in Maharashtra located West of the City Karad at distance of 12 km on Karad-Dhebewadi Road. This Village has a Dhuloba (Dhuleshwar) temple situated on top of a hill near the village. This is one of the Family Gods for a Dhangar Caste in Maharashtra.

== See also ==
- Dhangar
- [MARATHA]
