= Maan, Maharashtra =

Maan or Man is a taluka in Phaltan subdivision of Satara district of Maharashtra in India. The capital or administrative headquarters of this taluka is located at Dahiwadi.

== See also ==
- Mane (Maratha clan)
