= Chinchani =

- Village
- Location in Maharashtra, India
- Coordinates: 19.8835°N 72.6876°E
- Country: India
- State: Maharashtra
- District: Palghar

Government
  - Type: Gram Panchayat
- Elevation: 9 m (30 ft)

Population (2001)
  - Total: 13,435

Languages
  - Official: Marathi
- Time zone: UTC+5:30 (IST)
- PIN: 401503
- ISO 3166 code: IN-MH
- Vehicle registration: MH
- Website: maharashtra.gov.in

Chinchani is a Census Town in the Dahanu Taluka of Palghar District of Maharashtra, India.

== Geography ==
Chinchani is located at 19.87°N 72.7°E. It has an average elevation of 9 metres (29 feet). It is well connected by roads and nearby railway station. Also it is the important center of education and commercial activities in the region. Chinchani has a beach on the west coast. There is a place in the province of Ayacucho, Peru with the same name, located on the other side of the globe at latitude. -14.390833300000001°, longitude. -73.878333299999994°.

Vangaon railway station serves as a primary railway station around 8km away. Boisar railway station is around 10km, while Dahanu Road railway station is around 15km from the town. The twin town of Chinchani-Tarapur are separated geographically by borders of Dahanu & Palghar Talukas, where Chinchani come under the Dahanu Taluka and Tarapur in Palghar. And so it has good road connectivity with both the towns as well as Boisar. Regular ST buses (state transport) and Auto rickshaws to this nearby towns.

== Demographics ==
As of 2001 India census, Chinchani had a population of around 13,435. Males constitute 51% of the population and females 49%. Chinchani has an average literacy rate of 79%, higher than the national average of 59.5%; with male literacy of 83% and female literacy of 75%. 11% of the population is under 6 years of age.

Among minority languages, Gujarati is spoken by 26.80% of the population.
