= Sajjangad =

Fort in Maharashtra, India

- Satara district, Maharashtra
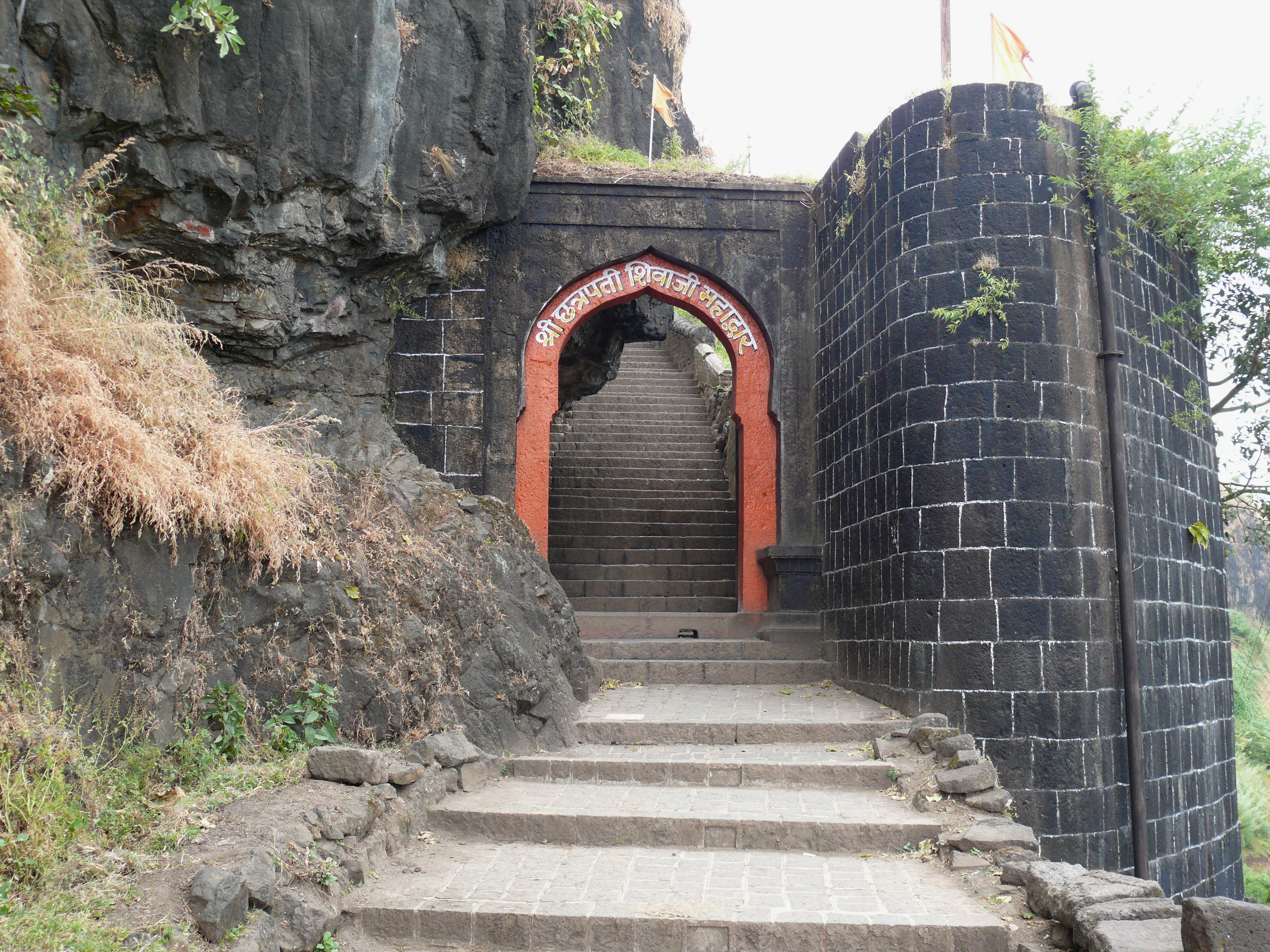
- Shivaji Mahadarwaja entrance of Sajjangad

Site information
- Type: Hill fort
- Open to the public: Yes
- Condition: In good condition

Location
- Shown within Maharashtra
- Coordinates: 17°38′58.9″N 73°54′43″E
- Height: 3350 feet

Site history
- Materials: Stone
- Difficulty: Very easy
- Open All Days 5.00am - 9.00pm

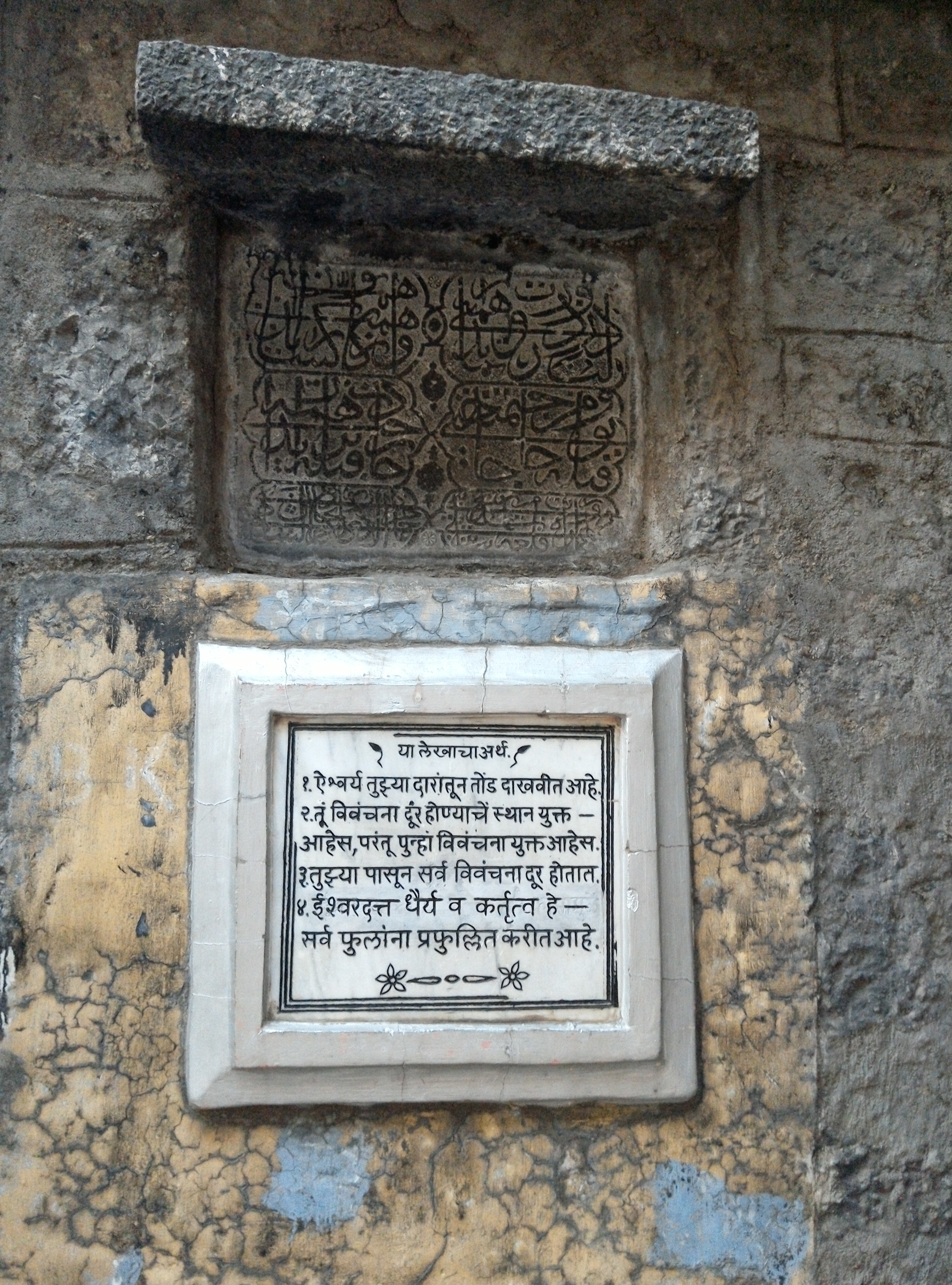
A plaque in Persian language-Sajjangad Fort, Satara-Maharashtra

Sajjangad, meaning "Fort of Good People", is located near the city of Satara, India. It is the final resting place of Sant Ramdas in 18th century India (born 1608). His teachings and works written in books such as Dasbodh are read and followed by many people even today in the state of Maharashtra and Sajjangad is a popular place of pilgrimage.

== History ==
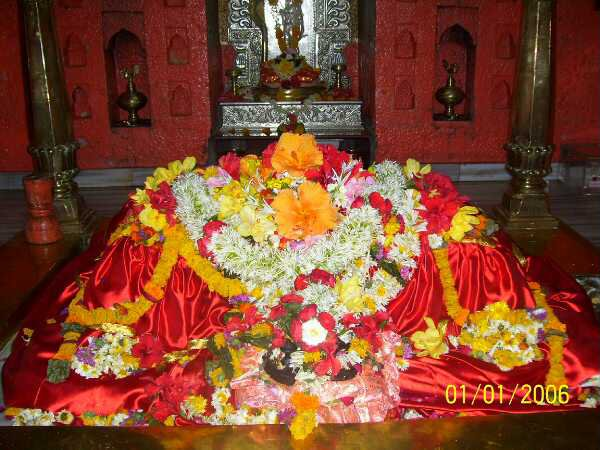
Samadhi of Samarth Ramdas at Sajjangad.

The fort was built by Bahamani rulers in between (1347-1527). Later (1527-1686) it came in possession of the Adilshahi dynasty. This fort was captured by Chhatrapati Shivaji Maharaj on 2 April 1673 from Adilshah. Previously known as Parali, it was renamed Sajjangad. It came into possession of the Mughals in 1700, and was renamed as Navrous Tara. The fort was recaptured within years by the Marathas. It remained in Maratha hands until the demise of the Maratha Empire by the British in 1818. It is good place for students to visit.

== Present day ==
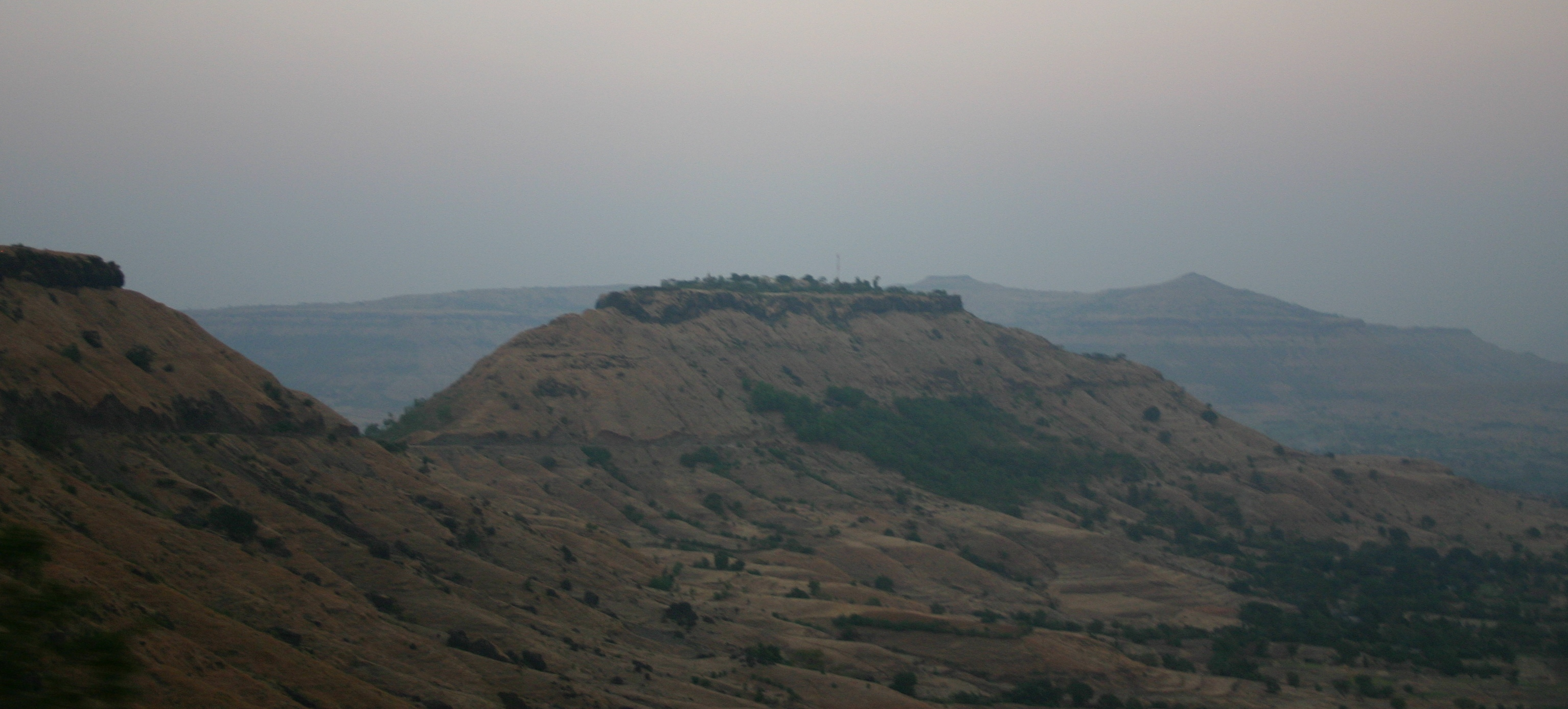
Sajjangad fortifications on the hill can be clearly seen.

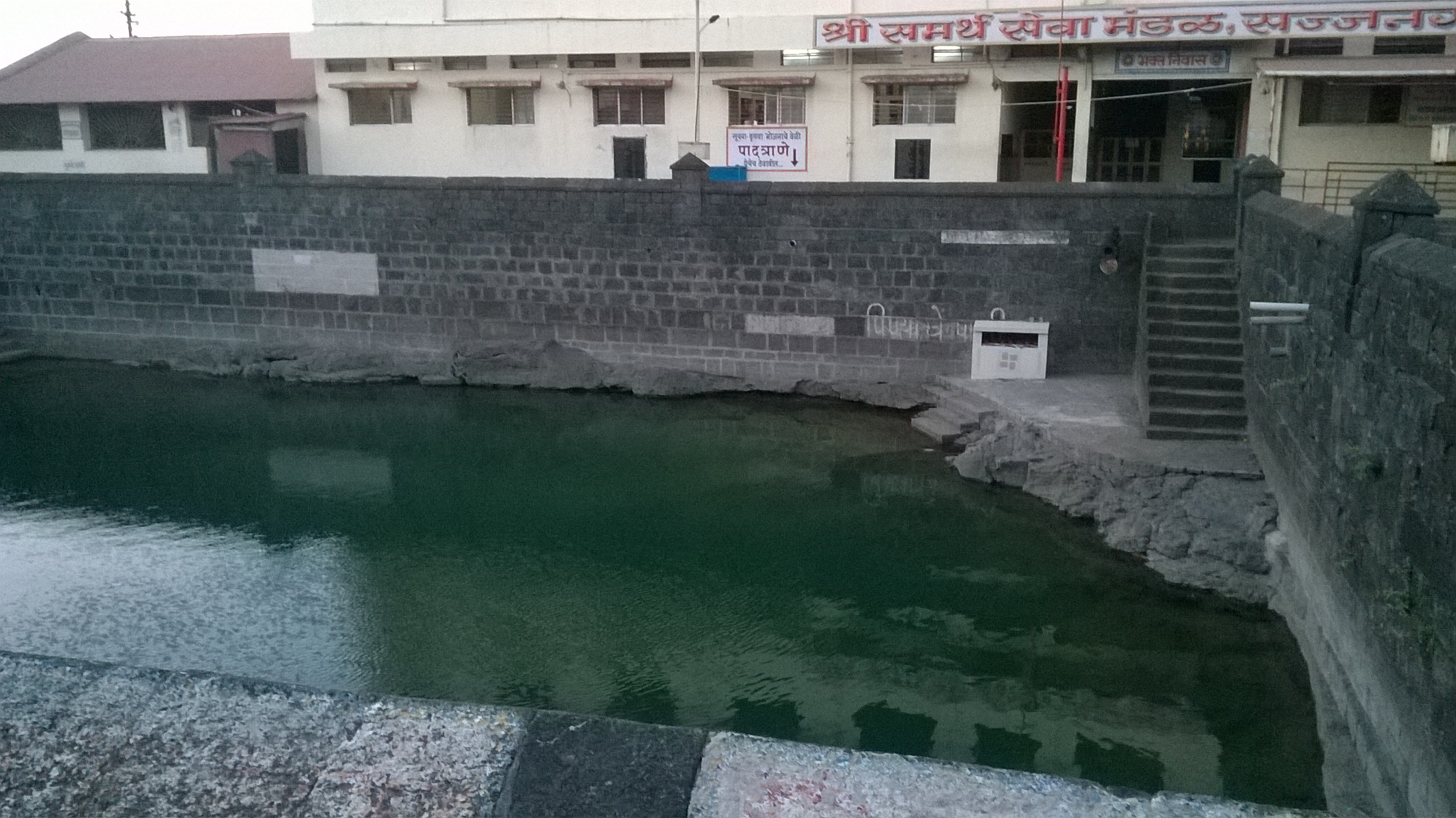
Sonale talav on the fort

The maintenance of the fort and the Samadhi (final resting place) of Sadguru Shri Samarth Ramdas Swami is taken care by 'Shri Ramdas Swami Sansthan' Trust and shri samarth seva mandal sajjangad which has existed since the time of 400 years . The daily routine of the trustees on the fort includes morning prayers, Abhishek and Puja, Maha Naivedya, Bhajans and reading of the Shrimat Dasbodh written by Sant Ramdas. The fort is open for devotees from 5.00am to 9.00pm.(all days). Entry and exit beyond these hours is restricted. In the afternoon and at night, devotees are served free of cost food (Prasad) by shri samarth seva mandal sajjangad and sansthan. They also provides free of cost accommodation for devotees who wish to stay overnight on the fort. Every year during Shiv Jayanti thousands of devotees visit the shrine by walking up to it.

== Transportation ==
It is possible to reach the top of the fort by vehicle. From there one has to climb around two hundred and thirty steps to reach the gate of the fort. It is exactly 18 km from Satara city. You can hire an autorickshaw or bus from a famous area of Satara Rajwada. It is 273 km from Mumbai via NH48 (earlier NH4) highway.

== See also ==
- Samarth Ramdas
- Shivaji
- List of forts in Maharashtra
- Dasbodh
