= Patan, Maharashtra =

Patan
- Town
- Location in Maharashtra, India Patan (India)
- Coordinates: 17.37°N 73.9°E
- Country: India
- State: Maharashtra
- District: Satara

Government
  - Body: Municipal Council

Population (2011)
  - Total: 150,000

Languages
  - Official: Marathi
- Time zone: UTC+5:30 (IST)
- Postal code: 415206
- ISO 3166 code: IN-MH
- Vehicle registration: MH 50 (Karad)
- Website: maharashtra.gov.in
- Patan Satara Maharashtra

Patan is a census town in Satara district in the Indian state of Maharashtra.

== Geography ==
Patan is located at 17.37°N 73.9°E. It has an average elevation of 582 metres (1909 feet).

== Demographics ==
As of 2001 India census, Patan had a population of 11,619. Males constituted 52% of the population and females 48%. Patan had an average literacy rate of 78%, higher than the national average of 59.5%: male literacy was 83%, and female literacy was 73%, and 12% of the population was under 6 years of age.

Patan, (Patan T; 17° 20' N, 73° 50' E; RS Karad 24 m. SE; p. 3,630) on the Karad-Kumbharli road at the junction of the Koyna and Kera rivers about twenty-five miles south-west of Satara was formerly a sub-divisional headquarters. The town consists of two parts (i) Rampur and (ii) Patan.

== History ==
The Patankar family was originally in two branches, of which the elder branch alone flourished. The younger branch represented by Hanmantrav resided in Rampur. His mansion, a fine large house was completely destroyed by fire in 1874. Next to it on the south is the mansion of Sardar Nagojirav Patankar, a first-class sardar and honorary magistrate who exercised civil jurisdiction in his area. The mansion with strong high stone walls and ramparts and a gateway flanked by bastions, is well maintained. A rose and plantain garden has been laid out close to it. The Patankars were the deshmukhs under the Marathas of the whole surrounding district and had charge of Dategad fort three miles to the north-west. During the struggles between the Peshvas and the Pratinidhis they did pretty much what they pleased. The elder branch is one of the few prosperous Maratha families in the district. There is no historical mention of Patan. But title deeds show that the Bijapur kings had a well established rule here. The district was assigned to the Pratinidhi by Ram Raja but was wrested from him by the Peshva after the rebellion of Yemaji Shivdev Mutalik in 1750 [ Grant Duff's Marathas Vol. I, 447.]. It was not finally secured to the Peshva till the time of Bapu Gokhale. Throughout the eighteenth century both the authorities issued contradictory orders but the carrying out of these orders largely rested on the will of the Patankars alone.

== Town ==
The town has a number of public buildings including three primary schools, two for boys and one for girls, four high schools in which one is newly formed English medium school, one college, two training colleges, the Nagojirav Vachanalaya, a primary health centre with a family planning center and a maternity home, a District Local Board dispensary, District Judge's court and a number of other offices, Besides of this there is also a big sport complex, a drama hall, banking facilities, Cottage hospital, e.g. Block Development office, Mamlatdar's office, District Local Board office, Post and telegraph office, etc. There is an inspection bungalow and a bridge is built recently on the Kera river. A weekly bazar is held on every Monday. Now Laxmi temple garden has been developed by citizens of Patan. Brick-forming factories is major industry. Koyna Dam is near from this city and is major tourist attraction.

== Education ==
In Patan there are 4 high schools namely Dadasaheb Patanakar High school, Mane Deshmukh Vidyalaya, Salunkhe High School and last Kanya (Girls) High school. Recently started Bhimrao Nagojirao Patankar formerly known as Nutan Marathi Shala for high school education.

In Patan, There is only one College named Balasaheb Desai College under Koyna Education Sanstha.
