= Koregaon =

- Town
- Location in Maharashtra, India
- Coordinates: 17.698°N 74.163°E
- Country: India
- State: Maharashtra
- District: Satara
- Taluka: Koregaon

Government
  - Body: Nagar Panchayat
  - MP: Udyanraje Bhonsale
  - MLA: Mahesh Shinde

Population (2011)
  - Total: 36,680

Languages
  - Official: Marathi
- Time zone: UTC+5:30 (IST)
- PIN: 415501
- Telephone code: (+91)2163
- Vehicle registration: MH 11 (Satara)
- Nearest city: Satara
- Lok Sabha constituency: Satara
- Vidhan Sabha constituency: Koregaon
- Literacy: 88.55%
- Sex ratio: 969 ♀/1000 ♂ (2011)

Koregaon is a census town and headquarters for the surrounding Koregaon Taluka in the Satara subdivision of [Satara district in the Indian state of Maharashtra. It is on the NH-548C Satara-Baitul National Highway.

== Demographics ==
In the 2011 India census, the town of Koregaon had a population of 26 987 individuals.

== See also ==
- Kinhai
- Shirdhon
