= Ajinkyatara =

Forth Capital of Maratha Empire

Ajinkyatara Fort
- Part of former Maratha Empire, now Maharashtra
- Satara District, Maharashtra(near Satara)
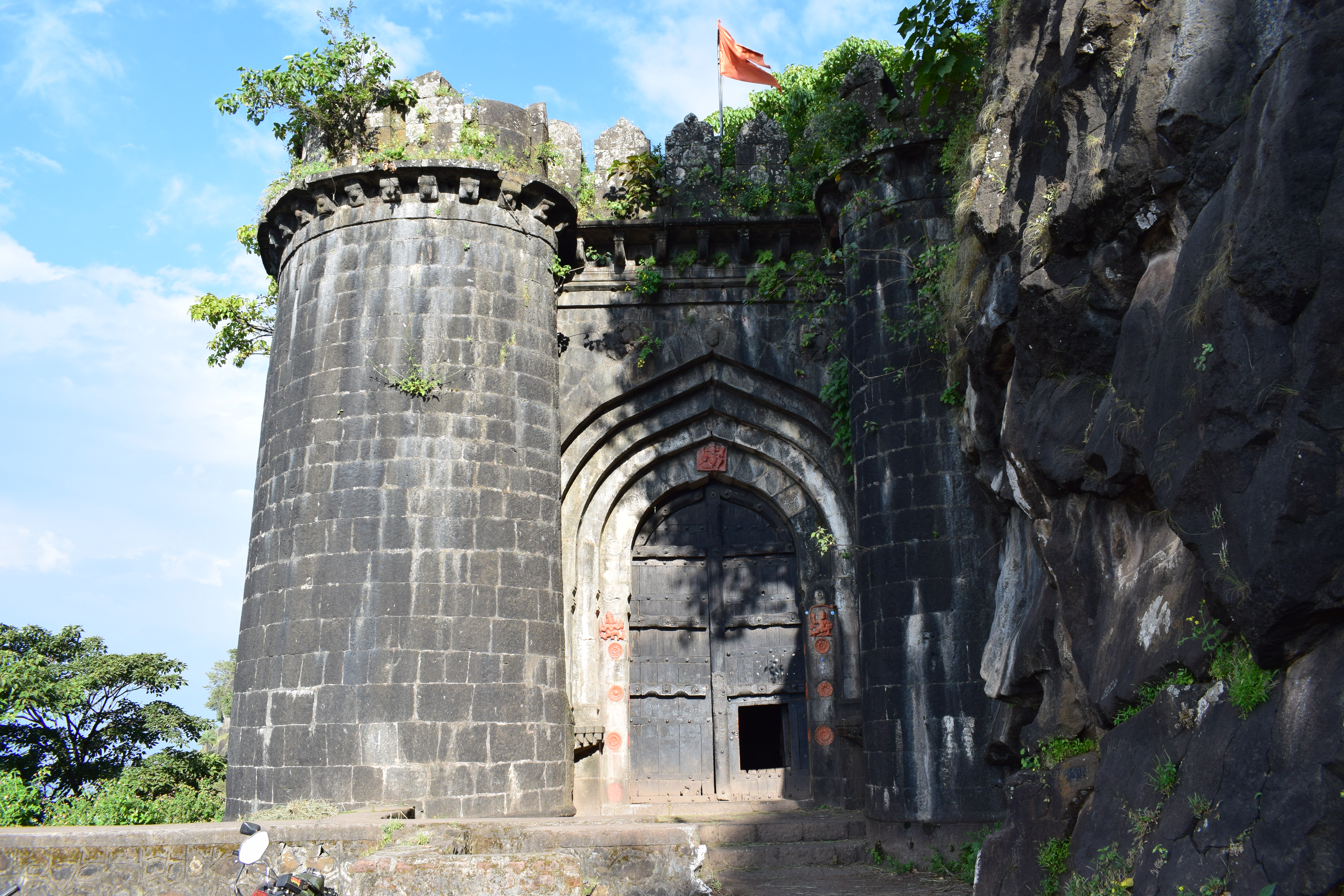
- Entrance to Ajinkyatara fort

Site information
- Type: Hill fort
- Owner: Maratha Empire (1706–1818); British East India Company (1818–1858); British Empire (1858–1947); Central Government of India (1947–present)
- Open to the public: Yes

Location
- Shown within Maharashtra
- Coordinates: 17°40′20.5″N 73°59′43.4″E
- Height: 1,356 metres (4,400 ft) ASL

Site history
- Materials: Stone, lead

Garrison information
- Past commanders: Shivaji
- Occupants: Shahu I

Ajinkyatara Fort, also known as the "Fort of the Sapta-Rishi," is a historical hill fort located on Ajinkyatara Mountain, one of the seven mountains surrounding the city of Satara in the Sahyadri Mountains of Maharashtra, India. Situated at an altitude of 3,300 feet, the fort overlooks Satara City and is considered one of the major heritage sites in Maharashtra.

== History ==
Ajinkyatara Fort, was constructed in the 12th century by Raja Bhoj of the Shilahara dynasty. Over time, the fort became a site of significant events in Maratha history.

In 1673 CE, Maratha Emperor Chhatrapati Shivaji Maharaj captured the fort from the Bijapur Sultanate. During his reign, the fort was under the charge of Manaji Sable, who served as its fort keeper. When Muhammad Mu'azzam, the second son of Mughal Emperor Aurangzeb, launched an assault on Ajinkyatara, Manaji Sable defended the fort against the Mughal forces.

Between 1700 CE and 1706 CE, the fort came under the control of Aurangzeb. During this period of Mughal occupation, the fort was referred to as Azamara. However, Tarabai, the Maratha queen and regent, successfully recaptured the fort from the Mughals and renamed it Ajinkyatara, meaning "The Invincible Star".

In 1708 CE, Shahu I seized the fort, after which it remained in Maratha possession until 1818 AD, when it was annexed by the British during the Third Anglo-Maratha War.

== Architecture and attractions ==
Ajinkyatara Fort is surrounded by 4-meter-high thick walls with bastions and features two gates. The main gate, located close to the northwest corner, is fortified with high buttresses, while the smaller gate is situated in the southeast corner. Inside the fort, there are several water tanks used for water storage. Visitors can explore the temples of Devi Mangalai, Lord Shankar, and Lord Hanuman, located on the northeast side of the fort.

The fort is known for its Maratha architecture and its views of Satara City. It is also home to the television tower for the city of Satara, as well as the TV tower for Pune. Ajinkyatara Fort attracts tourists who are interested in hiking, trekking, and mountaineering. The fort's trek is relatively easy. Additionally, a motorable road provides direct access to the fort's summit.

== Tourism and access ==
Ajinkyatara Fort is a tourist attraction in Satara. Tourists can reach the fort via road, with a two-hour drive from Pune and a four-hour drive from Mumbai. The nearest railway station is Satara Road, and the closest airport is Pune.

Apart from exploring the fort, visitors can engage in other activities in the vicinity. The Hanuman Temple, known for its spacious interior, and the Mahadev Temple are notable religious sites near the fort. Other attractions include Tara Rani's Palace, a significant historical site, the revered Mangaldevi Mandir, and the lakes within the fort.

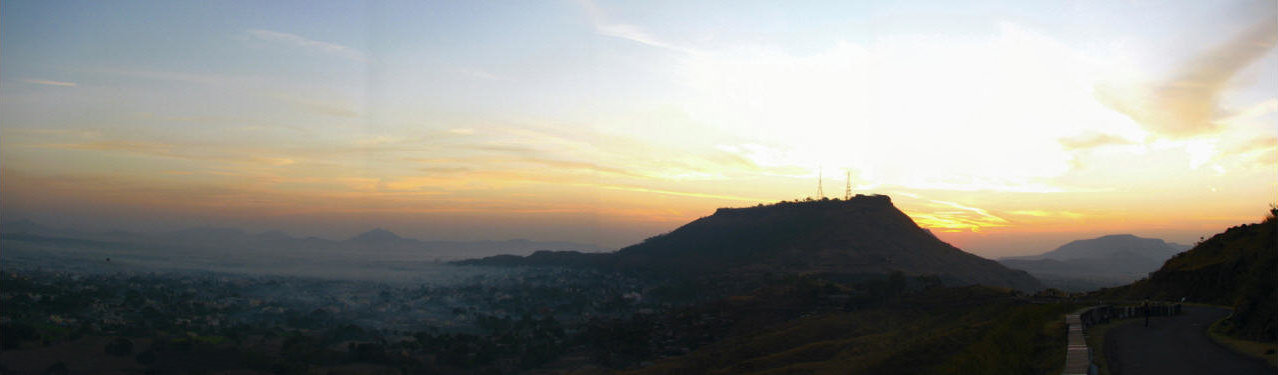
One of the most prominent forts in the history of Marathas, situated in Satara

== See also ==
- List of forts in Maharashtra
