= Satara district =

- District of Maharashtra
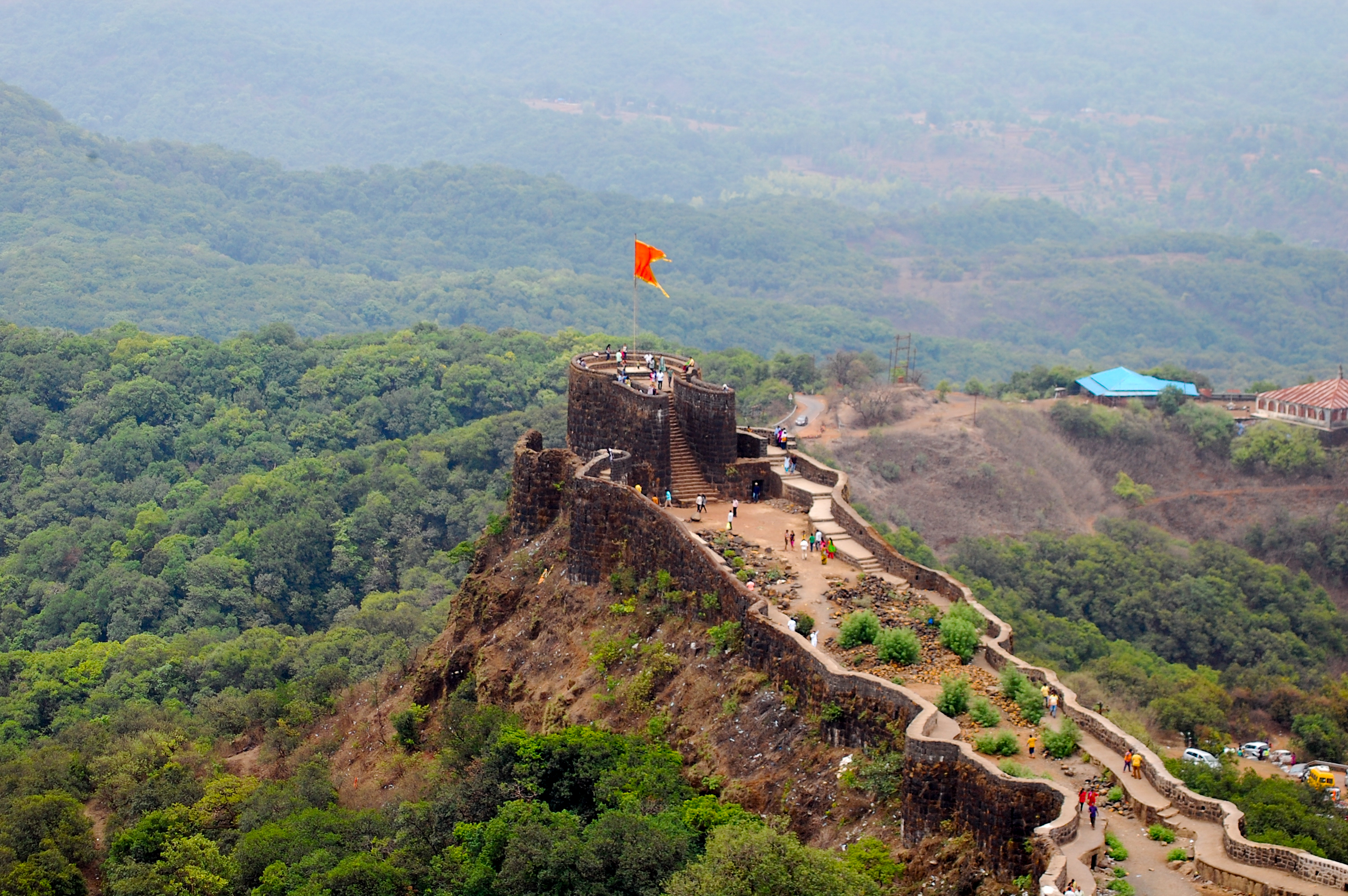
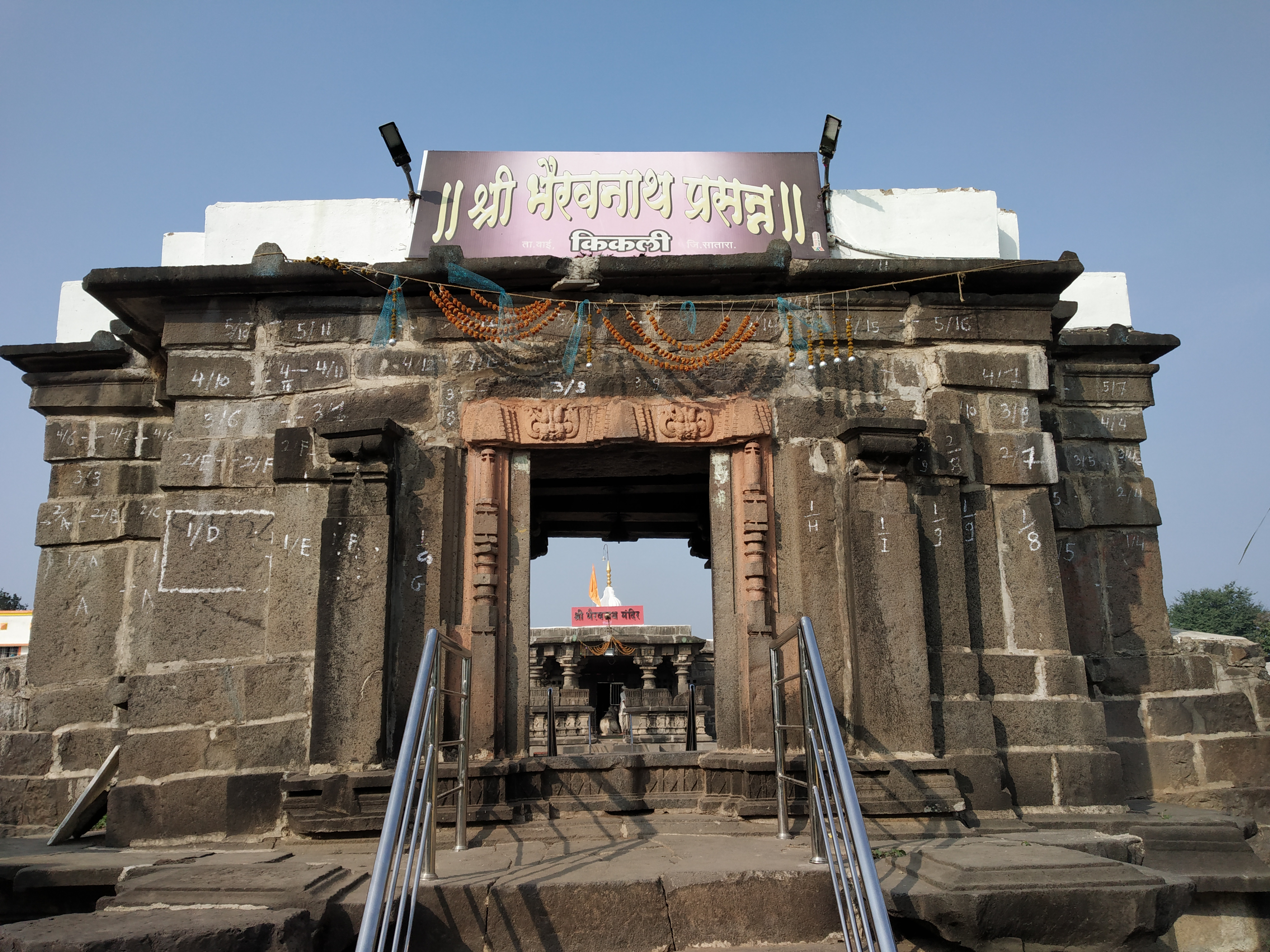
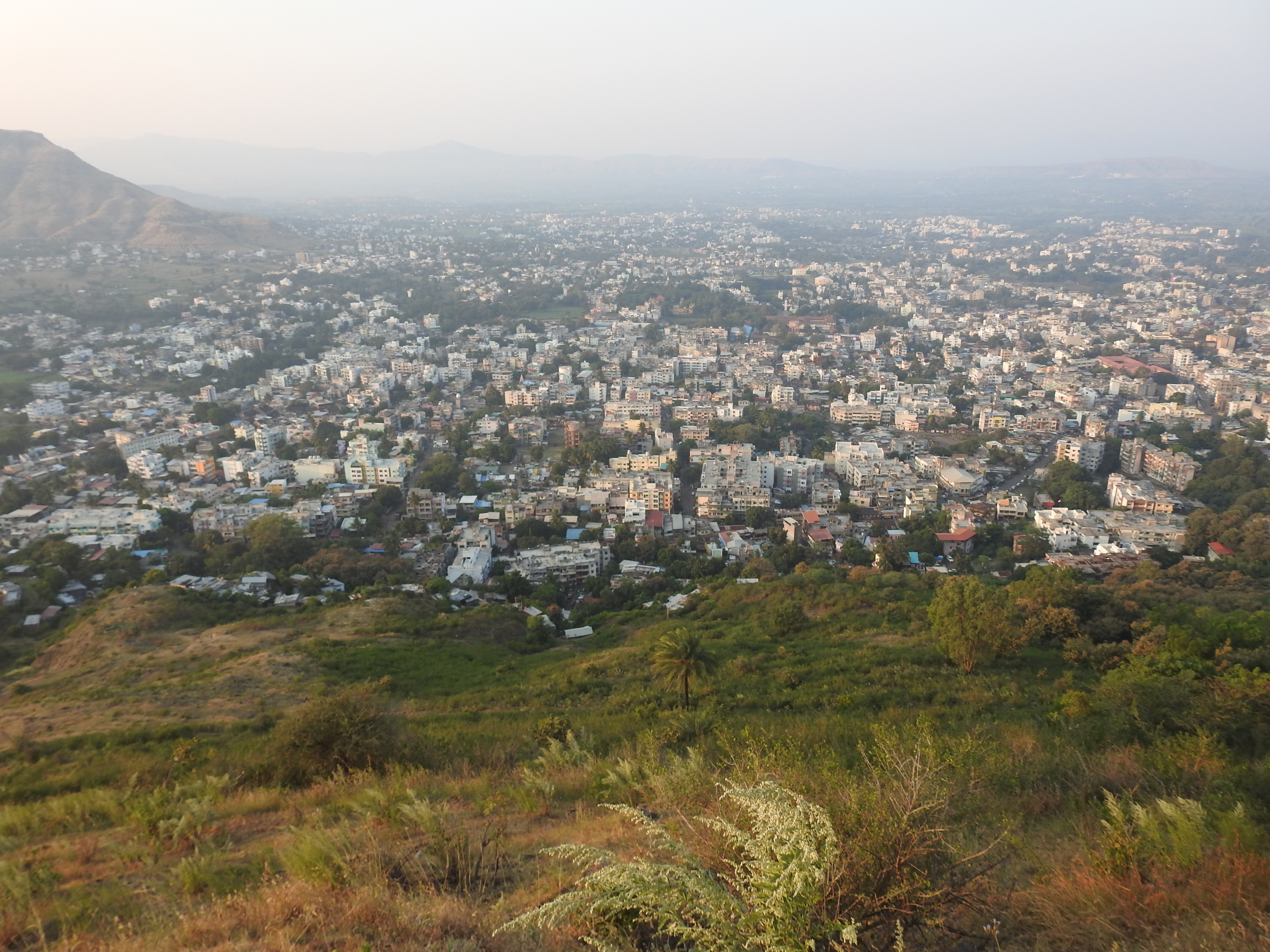
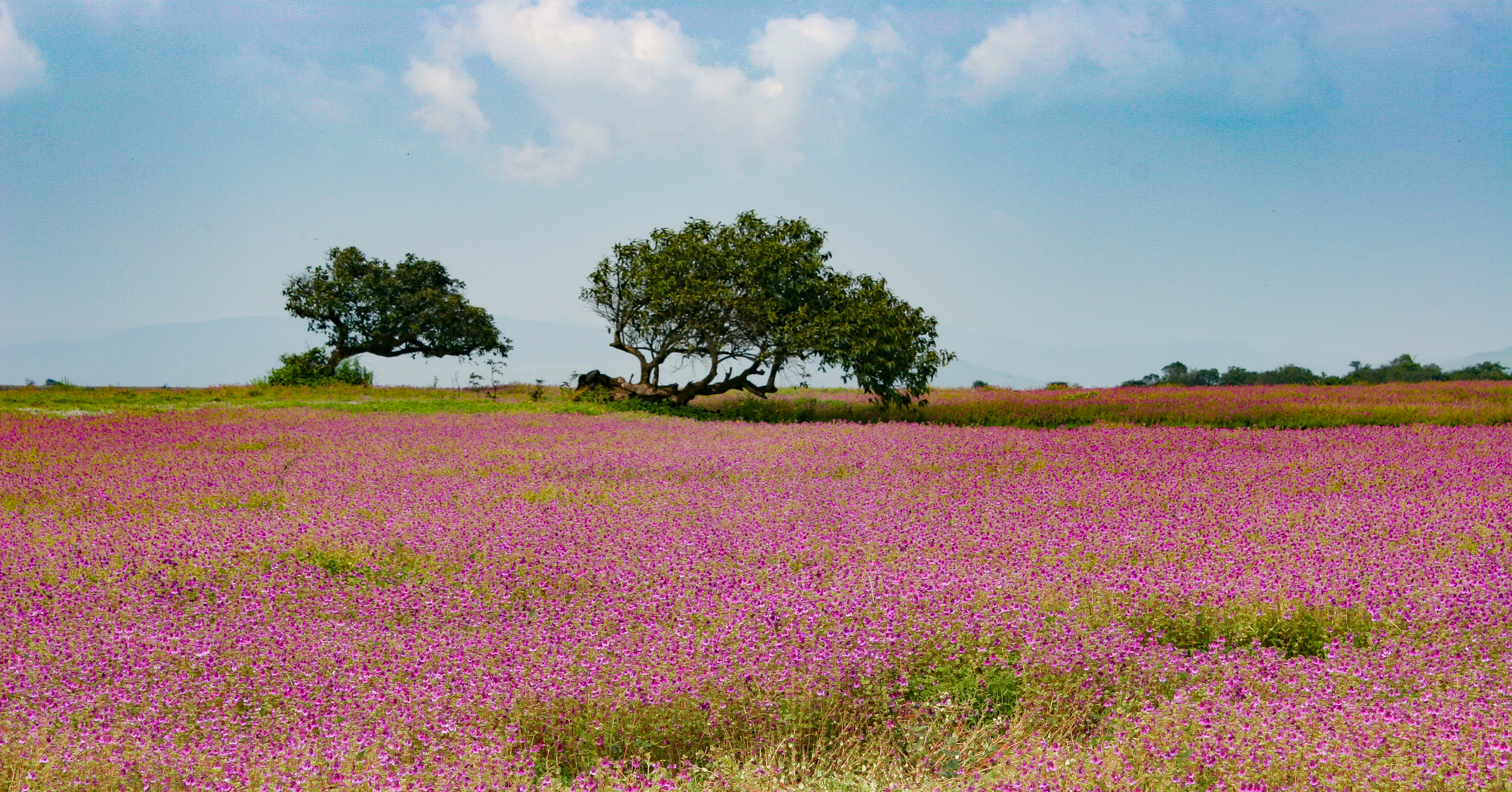
- Clockwise from top-left: Pratapgad Fort, View of Satara from Ajinkyatara Fort, Flowers at Kas Plateau, Bhairavnath Temple in Kikali

- Location in Maharashtra
- Coordinates: 17.70°N 74.00°E
- Country: India
- State: Maharashtra
- Division: Pune
- Headquarters: Satara

Government
  - Body: Satara Zilla Parishad
  - Guardian Minister: Shambhuraj Desai (Cabinet Minister MH)
  - President Z. P. Satara: Mrs. Priya Shinde
  - District Collector: Jitendra Dudi (IAS)
  - CEO Z. P. Satara: Dnyaneshwar Khilari (IAS)
  - MPs: Udayanraje Bhosale (Satara); Dhairyasheel Patil (Madha)

Area
  - Total: 10,480 km^{2} (4,050 sq mi)

Population (2011)
  - Total: 3,003,741
  - Density: 209/km^{2} (540/sq mi)

Languages
  - Official: Marathi
- Time zone: UTC+5:30 (IST)
- Tehsils: 1. Satara, 2. Karad, 3. Wai, 4. Mahabaleshwar, 5. Phaltan, 6. Maan, 7. Khatav, 8. Koregaon, 9. Patan, 10. Jaoli, 11. Khandala
- LokSabha: 1. Satara, 2. Madha (shared with Solapur district)
- Major Highways: NH-48, NH-160, NH-166E, NH-266, NH-548C, NH-548E, NH-965, NH-965D
- Website: www.satara.gov.in/en/

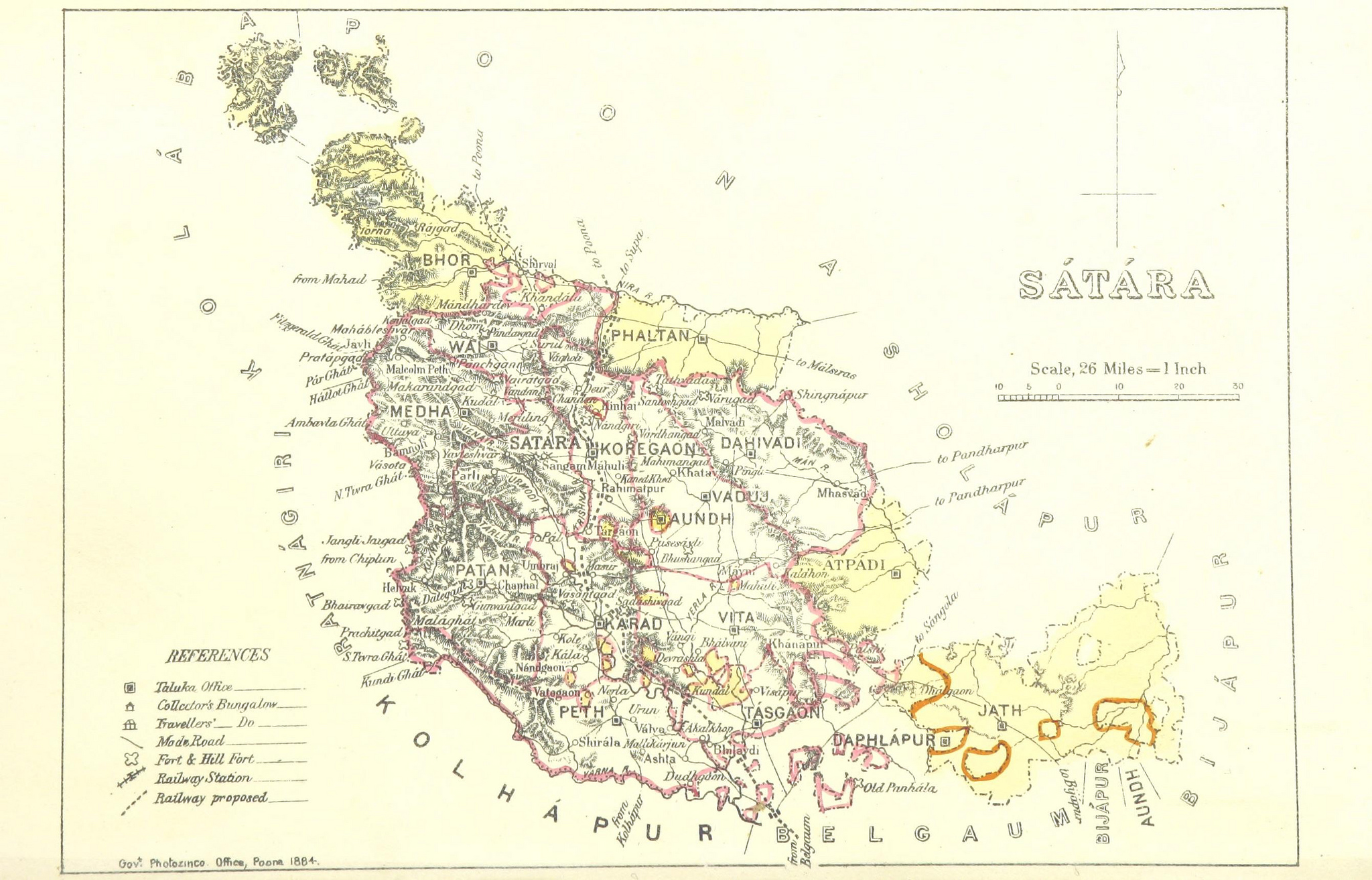
Satara 1896

Satara district (ISO: Sātārā Jilhā; Marathi pronunciation: [saːt̪aɾaː]) is a district of Maharashtra state in western India with an area of 10,480 km^{2} (4,050 sq mi) and a population of 3,003,741, of which 14.17% were urban (as of 2011). Satara is the capital of the district. Other major towns include Medha, Wai, Karad, Malkapur, Umbraj, Koregaon, Rahimatpur, Dahiwadi, Koynanagar, Phaltan, Lonand, Mahabaleshwar, Panchgani, Vaduj and Mhaswad. This district is under Pune Administrative Division along with Pune, Sangli, Solapur and Kolhapur. The district of Pune borders it to the north, Raigad borders it to the north-west, Solapur the east, Sangli to the south, and Ratnagiri to the west. Satara is home to a number of Maratha warriors such as Hambirrao Mohite, Prataprao Gujar, Tanaji Malusare, and Shindes of Kanherkhed.

The Sahyadri range, the main range of the Western Ghats, runs along the western edge of the district, separating it from Ratnagiri District. The Mahadeo range starts about 10 m north of Mahabaleshwar and stretches east and south-east across the whole of the district. The Mahadeo hills are made of visible, black rocks. The Satara district is part of two main watersheds; the Bhima River watershed, which is a tributary of the Krishna, includes the north and northeast of the district, north of the Mahadeo hills, while the rest of the district is drained by the upper Krishna and its tributaries. The forests in the hills have a large store of timber and firewood. The whole of Satara district falls within the Deccan Traps area; the hills consist of trap intersected by strata of basalt and topped with laterite, while, of the different soils on the plains, the commonest is the black loamy clay containing carbonate of lime. This soil, is fertile, but needs a lot of watering. Satara contains some important irrigation works, including the Krishna canal. In some of the western parts of the district the average annual rainfall exceeds 500 cm (200 in); but the eastern side is dryer, with rainfall varying from 100 cm (39 in) in the town of Satara to less than 30 cm (12 in) in some places farther east. The district is crossed north to south by a railway line, which passes 15 km (9.3 mi) east of Satara town.

The Mandhradevi Kalubai temple is located in Satara district, near the town of Wai. Located on a hill 1,417 m (4,649 ft) above sea level, the temple, some 20 km (12 mi) from Wai, overlooks the Purandhar Fort. Devotees attribute miraculous properties to a grove around the shrine. Legend has it that the temple is more than 400 years old and was built during Shivaji's rule. However, no definite date on the temple's construction is available. It was the scene of a crowd stampede on 25 January 2005.

== Officer ==
=== Members of Parliament ===
- Udayanraje Bhosale (BJP)
  (Satara)
- Dhairyasheel Patil (NCP SP)
  (Madha)

=== Guardian Ministers ===
Guardian Minister Satara
- पालकमंत्री सातारा
- Emblem of India
- Incumbent; Shambhuraj Desai since 24 September 2022
- Style: The Honourable
- Residence: Satara
- Appointer: Chief Minister of Maharashtra
- Term length: 5 years / No time limit
- Website: satara.gov.in/en/

Name	Term of office
Vijay Shivtare	31 October 2014 – 8 November 2019
Shamrao Pandurang Patil	9 January 2020 – 29 June 2022
Shambhuraj Desai	24 September 2022 – 26 November 2024
Shambhuraj Desai	18 January 2025 – Incumbent

=== District Magistrate/Collector ===
District Magistrate / Collector Satara
- जिल्हाधिकारी तथा जिल्हादंडाधिकारी सातारा
- Emblem of India
- Incumbent; Shri. Jitendra Dudi (IAS) since 7 June 2023
- Residence: At Satara district
- Appointer: Government of Maharashtra
- Term length: No time limit
- Website: satara.gov.in/en/

Name	Term of office
Shri. Jitendra Dudi (IAS)	7 June 2023 - Incumbent

== History ==
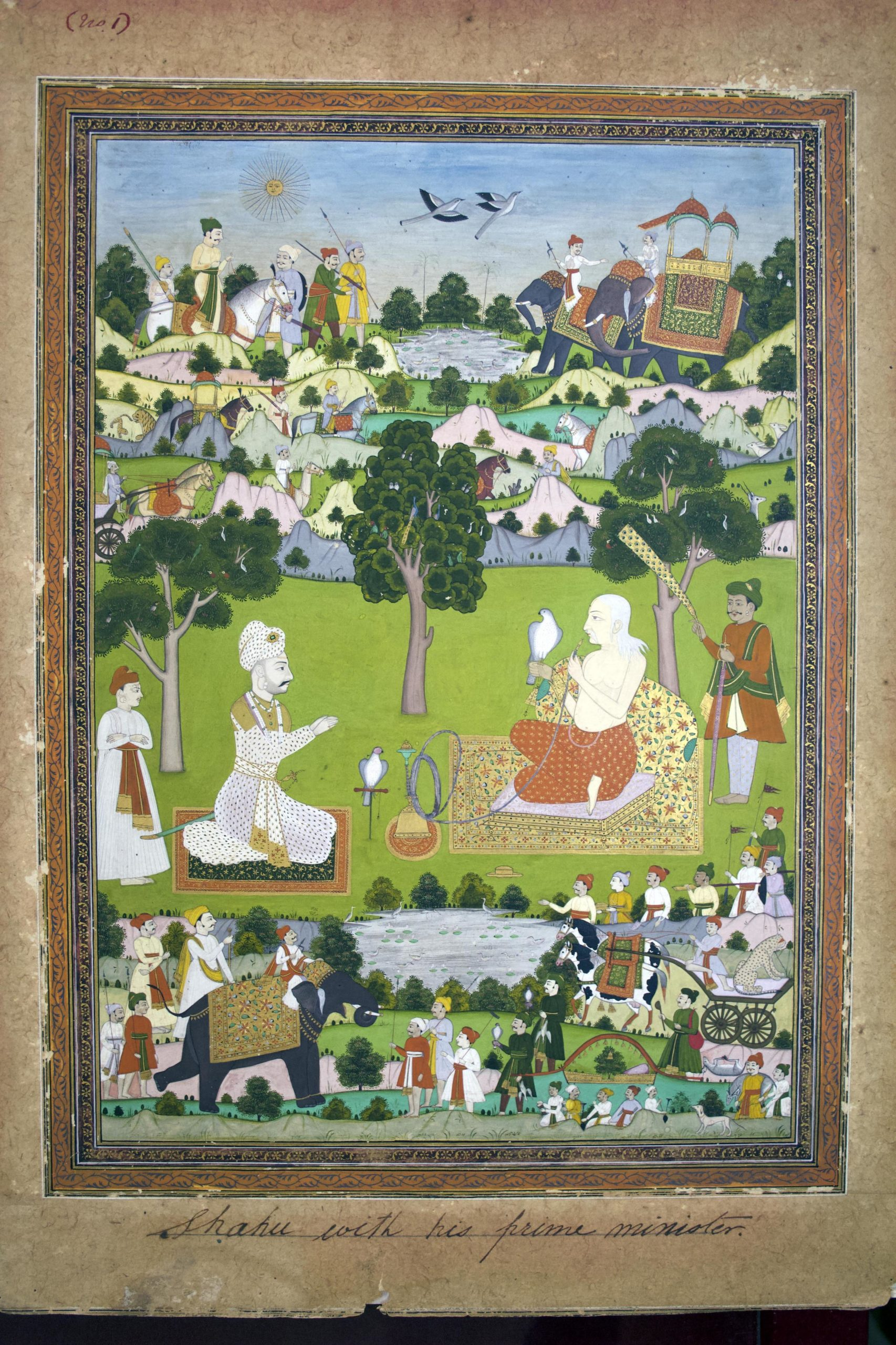
Chhatrapati Shahu I meets Peshwa Bajirao I, c. 1750 painting

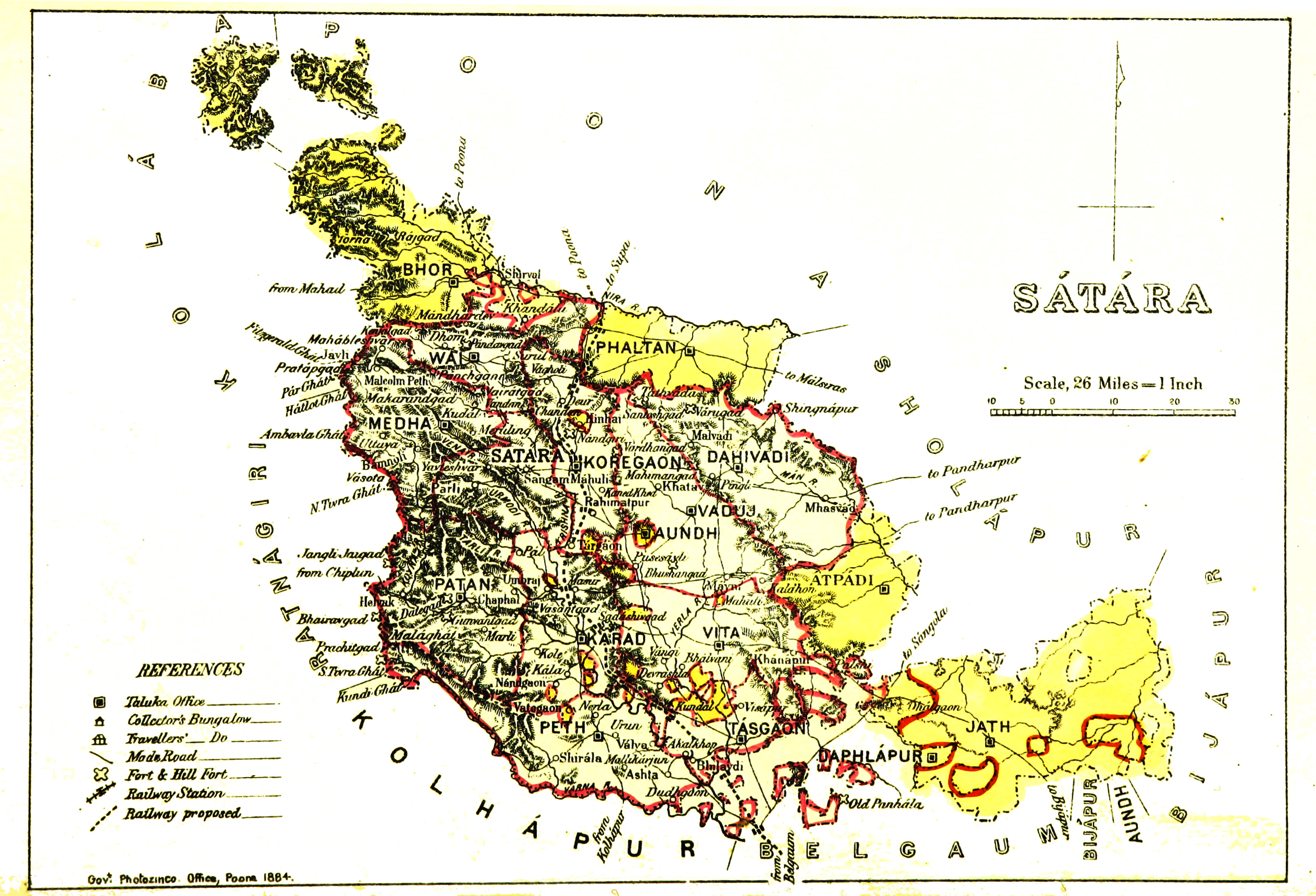
Satara district in 1884

Historical inscriptions as old as 200 BCE indicate the oldest known place in Satara district in Maharashtra is Karad (mentioned as Karhakada). It is also believed that the Pandavas stayed in Wai, then known as Viratnagari, in their 13th year of exile.

Satara District is the home of the Rashtrakuta Empire. The Rashtrakutas are believed to descend from Kuntala in the valley of river Krishna. Manank ruled from 350 to 375 C.E. and had built his capital in "Manapura" (now Maan in Satara district). The Vakatakas of Vidarbha were in conflict with Mananka. Subsequently, after the fall of the Vakatakas, the Rashtrakutas became fiefs of the Chalukyas, becoming prominent under Dantidurga around 753 CE.

The empire of Chandragupta II, known as Mahendraditya Kumargupta I, extended as far as Satara district in Deccan when he ruled between 451 AD to 455 AD. The Mauryan empire in the Deccan was followed by the rule of the Satvahanas for about two centuries between 550 A.D. to 750 AD.

The first Muslim invasion of the Deccan took place in 1296. In 1636, the Nizam Shahi dynasty came to an end. In 1663 Maratha Chatrapati Shivaji Maharaj conquered Parali and captured Satara fort. After the death of Shivaji, Aurangzeb conquered Satara fort, later captured by Parshuram Pratinidhi in 1706. In 1708, Chattrapati Shahu was crowned in the Satara fort. The direct descendants of Chatrapati Shivaji Maharaj continue to live in Satara.

After their victory in the Third Anglo-Maratha War in 1818, the British Empire annexed most of the Maratha territory to Bombay Presidency, but restored the titular Raja Pratap Singh, and assigned to him the principality of Satara, an area much larger than the modern district. As a result of political intrigues, Pratap Singh was deposed in 1839, and his brother Raja Shahaji was placed on the throne. When he died without a male heir in 1848, Satara was annexed by the British government and added to Bombay Presidency. The Satara Parallel government in Maharashtra from August 1943 to May 1946 opposed British rule, which was effectively overthrown in large parts of Satara district (now separated into Satara and Sangli districts) of Western Maharashtra.

== Divisions ==
Satara district consists of four subdivisions, namely Satara, Wai, Karad and Phaltan, divided into eleven talukas (tahsils). These are Satara, Karad, Wai, Mahabaleshwar, Phaltan, Man, Khatav, Koregaon, Patan, Jaoli, and Khandala. There are eight Vidhan Sabha constituencies in this district. Karad North, Karad South, Patan, Koregaon, Wai and Satara are part of Satara (Lok Sabha constituency) and Phaltan and Man are part of Madha (Lok Sabha constituency).

Tahsils (Talukas) of Satara District
Taluka	Capital
Satara	Satara
Karad	Karad
Wai	Wai
Koregaon	Koregaon
Jaoli	Medha
Mahabaleshwar	Mahabaleshwar
Khandala	Khandala
Patan	Patan
Phaltan	Phaltan
Khatav	Vaduj
Maan	Dahiwadi

In the year 2009, the Lok Sabha constituency of Karad was deprecated and it fused into the constituency of Satara. The new constituency of Madha was formed in the same year. Jaoli and Khatav Vidhan Sabha constituencies were deprecated, and Man and Phaltan were added to the constituency of Madha.

== Demographics ==
Historical population
Year	Pop.	±% p.a.
1901	849,672	—
1911	835,337	−0.17%
1921	786,436	−0.60%
1931	895,014	+1.30%
1941	1,013,212	+1.25%
1951	1,177,016	+1.51%
1961	1,430,105	+1.97%
1971	1,727,376	+1.91%
1981	2,038,677	+1.67%
1991	2,451,372	+1.86%
2001	2,808,994	+1.37%
2011	3,003,741	+0.67%

Religions in Satara district (2011)
Religion	Percent
Hinduism	89.62%
Islam	4.89%
Buddhism	4.70%
Jainism	0.43%
Other or not stated	0.36%

According to the 2011 census, Satara district has a population of 3,003,741, roughly equal to the nation of Albania or the US state of Mississippi. This gives it a ranking of 122nd in India (out of a total of 640). The district has a population density of 287 inhabitants per square kilometre (740/sq mi). Its population growth rate between 2001 and 2011 was 6.93%. Satara has a sex ratio of 988 females for every 1000 males, and a literacy rate of 82.87%. 18.99% of the population lives in urban areas. Scheduled Castes and Scheduled Tribes make up 10.76% and 0.99% of the population respectively.

=== Language ===
Languages of Satara district (2011)
1. Marathi (93.0%)
2. Hindi (3.60%)
3. Urdu (0.90%)
4. Others (2.45%)

At the time of the 2011 census, 93.05% of the population spoke Marathi, 3.60% Hindi and 0.90% Urdu as their first language.

== Education ==
The Sainik School in Satara is one of the oldest residential schools preparing boys for military career. The boys are prepared for the National Defence Academy UPSC examination, and also for technical entries into the Army, Navy, and the Airforce. Ex-Chief of the Air Staff, Air Chief Marshal Pradeep Vasant Naik is an alumnus of this institution, amongst many officers that serve or have served in Indian Armed Forces. This is the first Sainik School established in India and is under the authority of the Ministry of Defence.

The Government of Maharashtra started the Government Medical College in Satara in 2021. Every year, the college admits 100 students to the undergraduate (MBBS) course via NEET. A 15% AIQ quota is in place for all India students, and 85% is the state quota.

The Krantisinh Nana Patil College of Veterinary Science, Shirwal is affiliated with Maharashtra Animal and Fishery Sciences University.

There are also institutes run by the Rayat Shikshan Sanstha. Karmaveer Bhaurao Patil College of Engineering and Polytechnic is run by Rayat Shikshan Sanstha and is one of the oldest and most reputed engineering colleges in Satara.

In primary education, SEMS, Mona School Satara, Nirmala Convent, KSD Shanbhag Vidyalaya, and Chhatrapati Shahu Academy, Narmada are some of the oldest oldest English medium schools which are affiliated with the Maharashtra state board, while the Podar International School is affiliated with the Central Board of Secondary Education. Amongst Marathi medium schools, there are Rayat Shikshan Sanstha's Anna Saheb Kalyani Vidyalaya, Maharaja Sayajirao Vidyalaya, Anant English School, and New English School in the city.

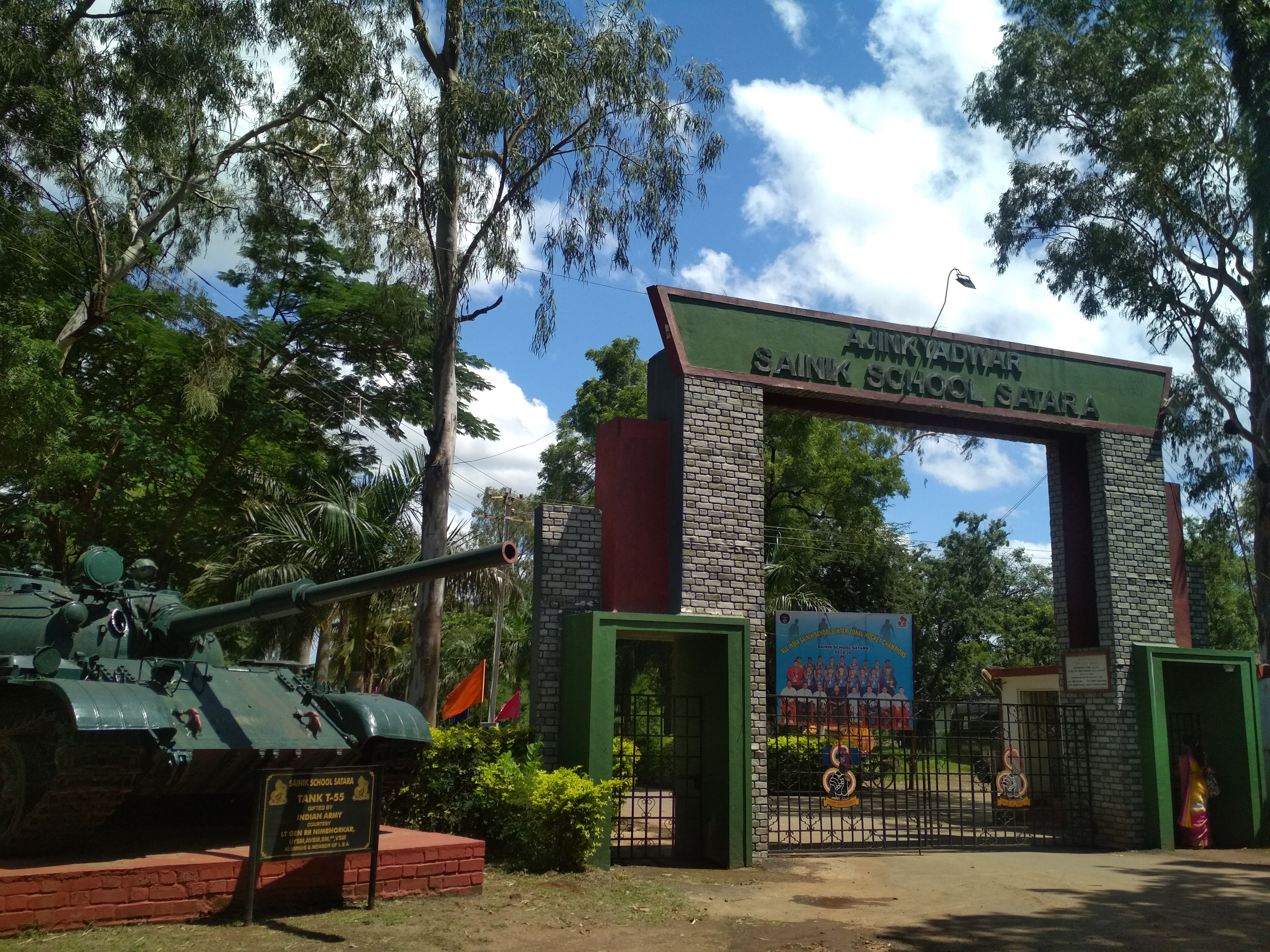
Sainik School Satara

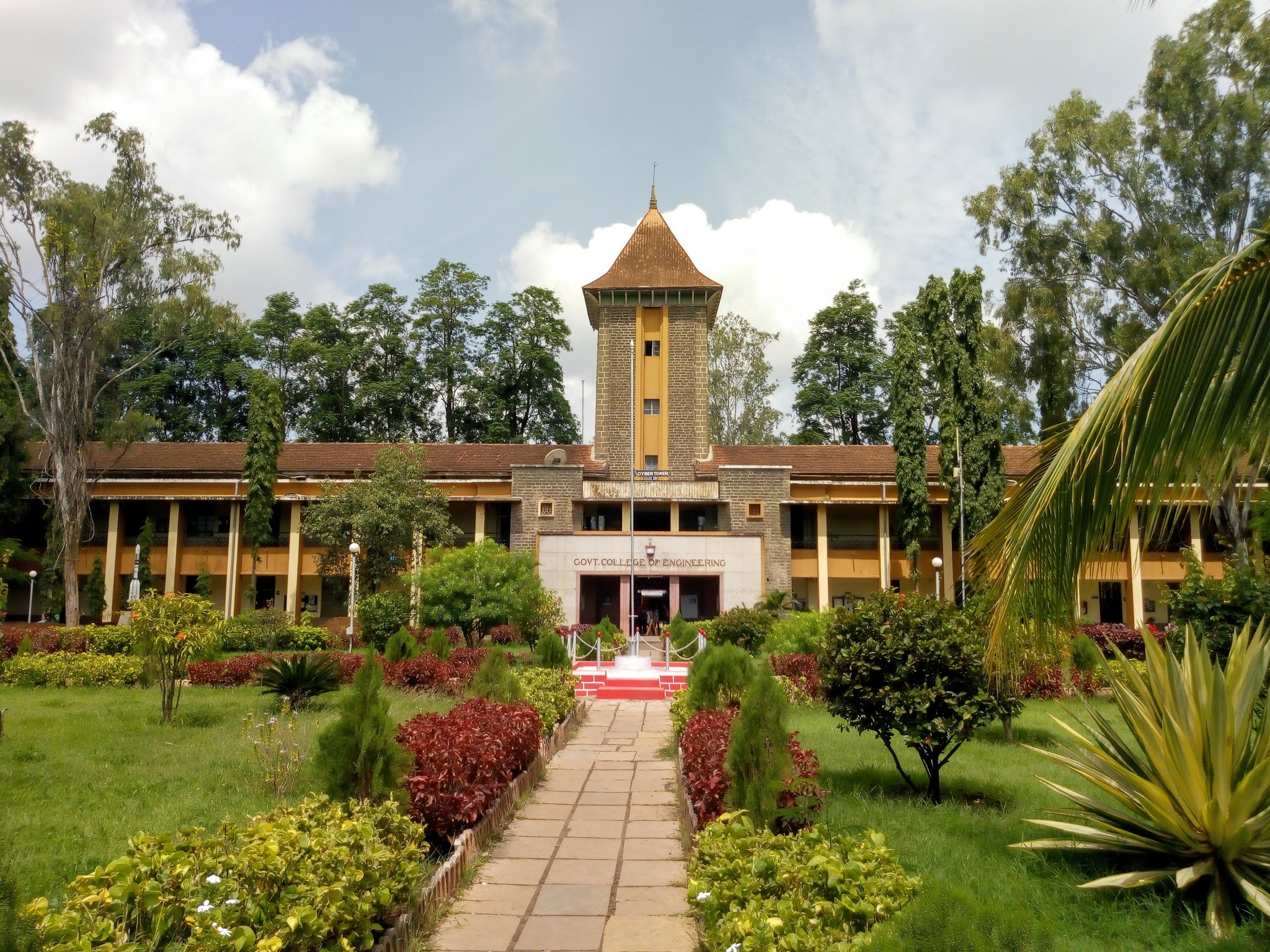
Government College of Engineering Karad (Satara)

== Villages and towns ==
- Adarki
- Andrud
- Bhilkati
- Garavadi
- Gharewadi
- Ghot
- Godoli
- Jakhangaon
- Jihe
- Karanje Turf Satara
- Kashil
- Kondhwali
- Lonand
- Mahu
- Niham
- Pachwad
- Pateshwar
- Phaltan
- Sakharwadipune
- Sonake
- Tambave
- Tirthkshetra Padali
- Vele
