= Kas Plateau Reserved Forest =

World Natural Heritage Site in Maharashtra, India

Kas Plateau
- IUCN category IV (habitat/species management area)
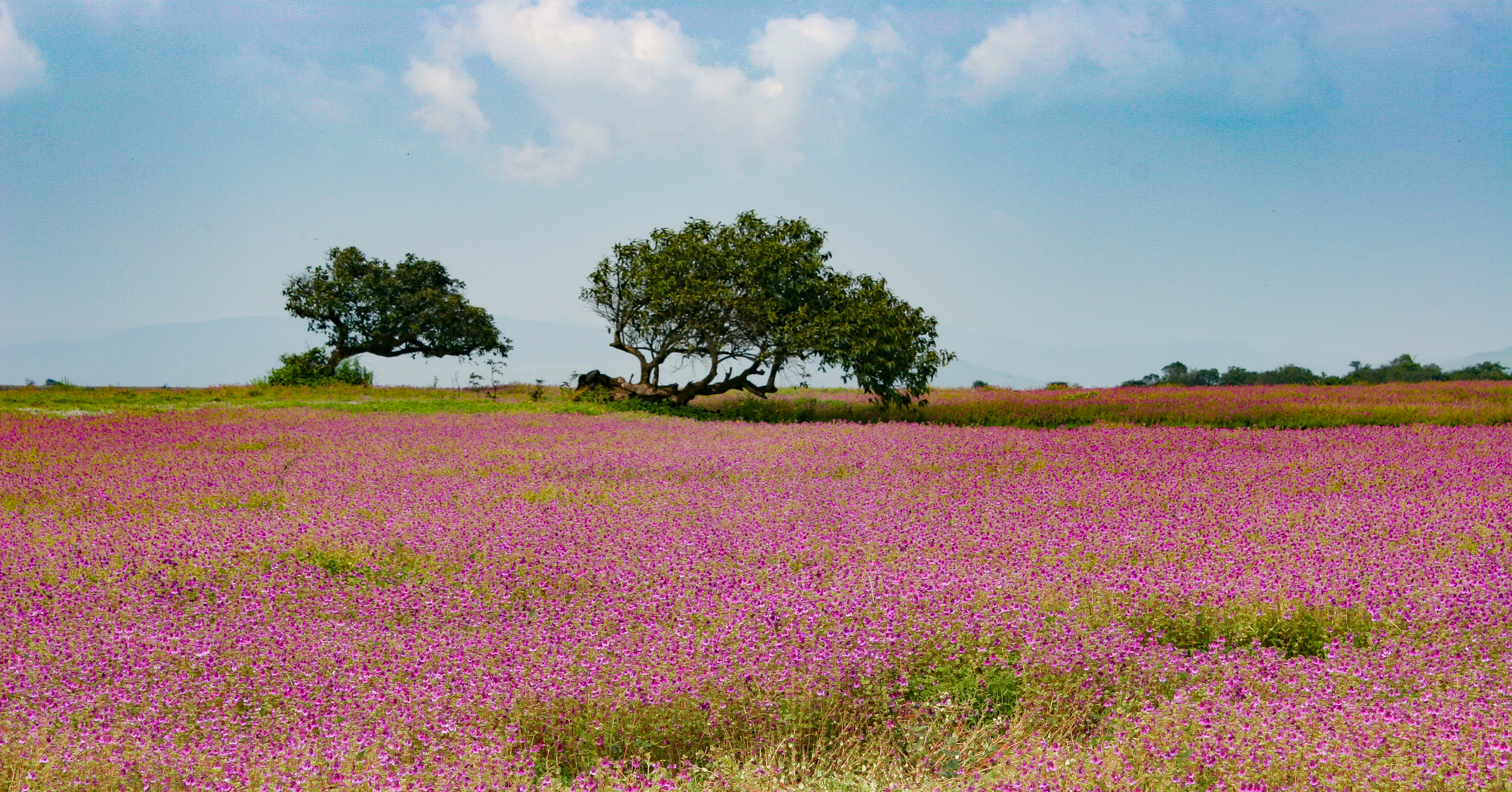
- Kas Plateau

- Location within Maharashtra
- Location: Satara, Maharashtra, India
- Nearest city: Satara, Pune, Kolhapur
- Coordinates: 17°43′12″N 73°49′22″E
- Area: 10 km^{2} (3.9 mi^{2})
- Governing body: Ministry of Environment and Forests, Government of India
- Website: www.kas.ind.in

UNESCO World Heritage Site
- Official name: Natural Properties - Western Ghats (India)
- Type: Natural
- Criteria: ix, x
- Designated: 2012 (36th session)
- Reference no.: 1342
- Region: Indian subcontinent

The Kas Plateau Reserved Forest, also known as the Kas Pathar, is a plateau situated 25 kilometres west of Satara city in Maharashtra, India. It falls under the Sahyadri Sub Cluster of the Western Ghats. It became a part of a UNESCO World Natural Heritage Site in 2012.

It is a biodiversity hotspot known for various types of seasonal wildflowers that bloom and numerous species of endemic butterflies annually in the months of August and September. The plateau is situated at an altitude of 1200 metres and is approximately 10 square kilometres in area. These include orchids, shrubs such as the Karvy, and carnivorous plants such as Drosera indica. Kas Pathar is a plateau made from volcanic rocks in the Satara district of Maharashtra, and comes under the biosphere of the Western Ghats. The flora of Kas, i.e., the entire flowering plants and their related plants are typically restricted to that particular locality only. This is because the plateau is largely formed of basalt, which is directly exposed to the atmosphere. The basalt is almost covered entirely by a thin cover of soil formed due to erosion and has accumulated a layer of not more than 25 mm or so.

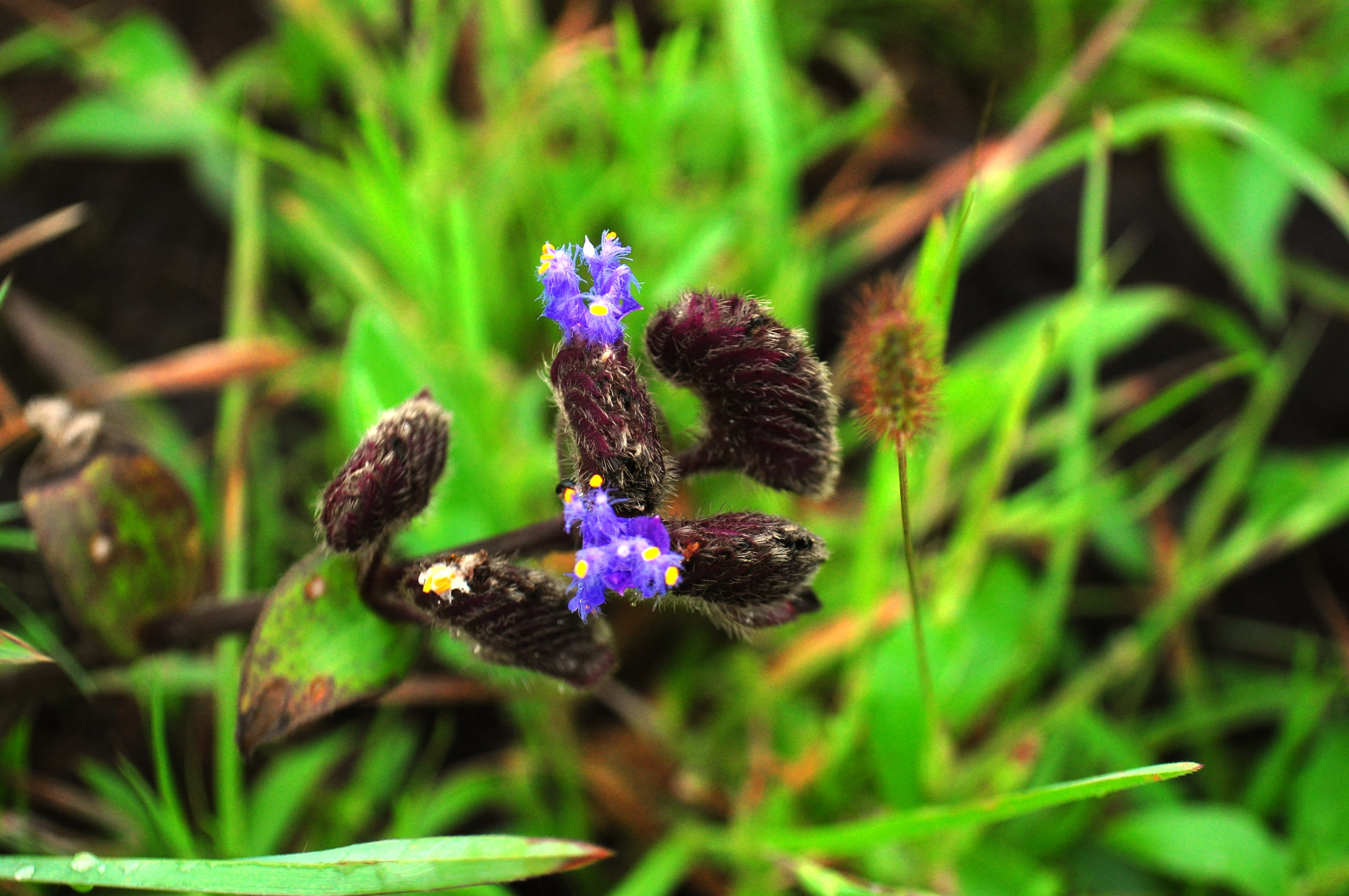
Cynotis tuberosa

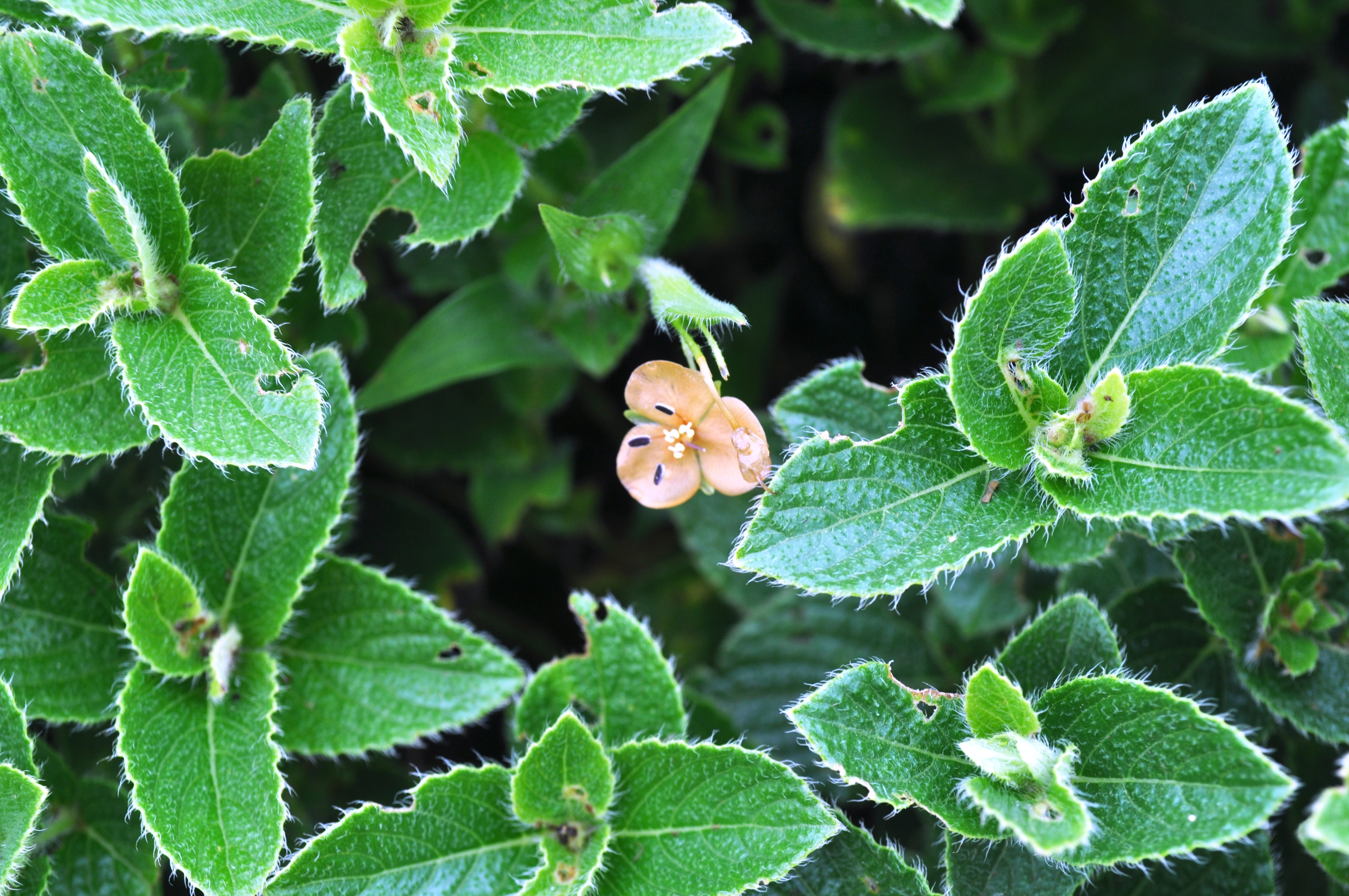
Murdannia lanuginosa

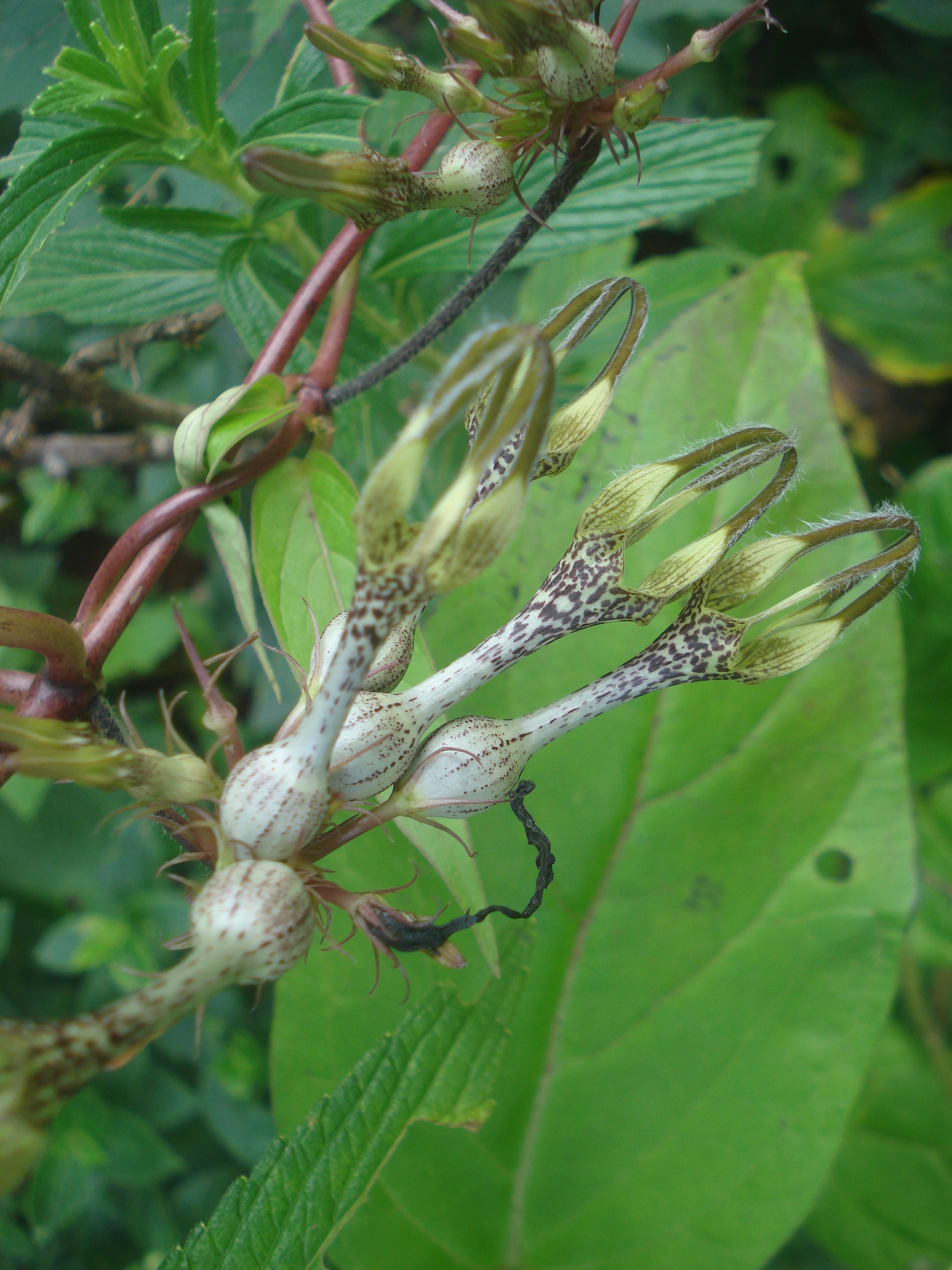
Ceropegia vincifolia (locally known as Kandilpushpa/Kandil kharchudi)

== About ==
The Kas Plateau is located near Satara. It is situated high hill plateaus and grasslands turns into a 'valley of flowers' during monsoon season, particularly from August to early October. It contains more than 150 types of flowers, shrubs and grasses. Orchids in the Kas Plateau bloom for a period of 3–4 weeks during monsoon season. Kas Plateau is a World Natural Heritage site, part of the Sahyadri Sub-cluster. To control possible damage by tourists, the number of visitors to the plateau has been restricted to 3,000 per day. In September, some of the most common flowering plants are Eriocaulon spp., Utricularia spp., Pogostemon deccanensis, Senecio grahamii, Impatiens lawii and Dipcadi montanum.

The plateau experiences a natural cycle of extreme conditions, with wet water-logged cool monsoons, very dry hot summers (45 °C) and dry winters (5 °C). The soil is acidic only a thin layer on top of laterite rock underneath. Extreme seasonality influences the ecology of the site.

== Geography ==
The Kas Plateau is located around 25 km from Satara. There are two ways to reach Kas: directly from Satara or from Tapola via a link road connecting Mahabaleshwar and Panchgani to Kas Pathar. Kas Plateau is 20 km away from the northern part of Koyana Sanctuary. The major portion of the plateau is reserve forest. Kas lake (built 100 years ago) is a perennial source of water supply for western part of Satara city by gravity. The flora of Kas are around the locality of that area. The plateau is largely formed of basalt which is directly exposed to the atmosphere. The basalt rock is covered by a thin cover of soil formed due to erosion and has accumulated a layer of not more than an inch or so. This soil is neither black nor lateritic. At certain places water gets accumulated because of uneven surface. The plants growing on Kas Plateau are typically of herbaceous nature like grasses. The small shrubs and trees are located at the periphery of the plateau.

The various distances of Kas Plateau are as follows:

- From Satara - 25 km
- From Pune - 125 km
- From Mumbai - 278 km
- From Kolhapur - 150 km
- From Sangli - 147 km
- From Karad - 72 km

== Biodiversity on Kas Plateau ==
The Kas Plateau is rich in its bio-diversity. Many species observed on the plateau are new to the botanical science. Many endemic, endangered plants are found on the plateau. More than 850 species of flowering plants are reported on the plateau. 624 species have entered in the Red Data Book. Out of these 624 species, 39 are found only in the Kas Region.

The main plateau of Kas has been surveyed in detail by many researchers. The other three plateaus have not been surveyed. The earliest work on the plateau was by Chavan et al. (1973). Dr. Bachulkar studied endemic flora of this area. Bhattarai et al. 2012 have identified 103 species of local concern on the Kas Plateau and in the surrounding area. Lekhak and Yadav, 2012 have documented the floristic wealth of the Kas plateau.

The vegetation and biodiversity values of the Kas Plateau as a representative site of the threatened rocky plateau habitat have been discussed by Porembski and Watve (2005) and Watve (2007), 2010) One study has been published on the pollination mechanism (Hobbhahn et al., 2006 that includes field studies carried out on Kas.

A list of lichen species from the Kas area has been compiled by Dr. Gayatri Chitale and Archana Dube during their doctoral studies from Maharashtra, which includes 14 species of macro lichens and 6 species of micro lichens found on the Kas Plateau.

Chikane and Bhosale (2012) have compiled a herpetofaunal list of the Kas area including 57 species. Photo documentation of spiders from Kas is available with Vishal Deshpande, Ranwata. A list of birds (about 200+ species) has been compiled by Vikram Hoshing, Sanjay Thakur and many other bird watchers of the area. Fish in the Kas area are studied by Sunil Bhoite and Dr. Neelesh Dahanukar. Although a list of invertebrates has not been compiled, Dr. Hemant Ghate (Modern College, Shivajinagar, Pune) and his students have been recording faunal diversity of Kas for more than a decade. In July 2025 Gayatri Pawar and Sandhya Pawar recorded Aquatic Insect Diversity including 75 species and Vegetation and Physico- Chemical Parameter of Lakes on Kas Plateau The pond has also been studied for microfossils by the Department of Geology, Agharkar Research Institute.

Many popular books have appeared in Marathi and English, including photoguides by Shrotri (2007), Shrikant Ingalhallikar (Flowers of Kas 2012), and another by Satara Forest department in 2012.

Herbaceous plant communities of this plateau were systematically surveyed during 2004–2006 as a part of Department of Science and Technology funded project on plant communities of rocky plateaus. In a sampling area of 25 sq.m, H’ =3.88 and 40 herbaceous species were reported in September 2004, followed by H’ =3.971 and 29 herbaceous species in September 2005, indicating rich herbaceous diversity.

Kas is the type locality of the following species

Flowering plant:

1. Arisaema ghaticum (Sardesai, S.P.Gaikwad & S.R.Yadav) Punekar & Kumaran
2. Chrysopogon castaneus Veldkamp & Salunkhe
3. Eriocaulon epedunculatum Potdar, Anil Kumar bis, Otaghvari and Sonkar
4. Eulalia shrirangii Salunkhe & Potdar
5. Jansenella neglecta S.R.Yadav, Chivalkar & Gosavi

Insects (Beetle): A new genus:

- Kashmirobia Konstantinov & Prathapan

A new genus & species:

- Kashmirobia hugeli Konstantinov & Prathapan
- Chiridopsis nigropunctata Borowiec & Ghate

In addition to this, the following species have been rediscovered from Kas

- Crinum brachynema reported by M. Bachulkar
- Dipcadi maharashtrensis reported by P. Tetali and others
- Cassida flavoguttata - Tortoise beetle rediscovered from Kas by Ghate et al., earlier known from the Nilgiris

Snake:

- Striped Coral Snake: Patteri Povala was rediscovered by Sahyadri Trekking Group

Kas is very famous for the mass blooming of Eriocaulon spp., Utricularia spp., Impatiens lawii and Smithia spp. All the typical microhabitats and species complexes of lateritic plateau are seen here.

The plateau also has several invertebrates throughout the year. Tiger beetles are observed mating in large numbers on Kas during September–October. Praying mantises, ants are common. Tadpole shrimps were reported some years back. Fairy shrimps are present in the small pond. The plateau has several signs of the presence of barking deer, hares, civets and rodents. Gaur has been reported by Sunil Bhoite from Satara in 2012. Ruddy mongoose, Rusty spotted cat have been observed in surrounding scrub area. Presence of Leopard has been reported from the surrounding forest area. Endemic Malabar Lark is commonly observed nesting on the rocky plateau.

== Other attractions ==
Bhambavli Flower Plateau, largest flower plateau of the world is situated 3 km away from Kas Plateau (reference - www. satara.gov.in). Kas lake is on the south of the Kas Plateau and is surrounded by dense forest. It lies between Sajjangad fort and the Kanher Dam. Koyna project is around 30 km towards the south of Kas Lake. Bhambavli Vajrai Waterfall is also near Kas which is one of India's highest waterfalls.

== Flowers ==
The following is a list of some of the flowers found at Kas:

1. Adenoon indicum (local name mothi sonaki)
2. Aerids maculosum
3. Aponogeton satarensis (local name Vaytura)
4. Arisaema murrayi (local name Pandhara Sapkanda)
5. Begonia crenata
6. Ceropegia jainii (local name Somada)
7. Ceropegia vincifolia (local name Kandilpushpa/ Kandil kharchudi- कंदिल खर्चुडी)
8. Ceropegia media
9. Chlorophytum glaucoides (local name Musali)
10. Cyanotis tuberosa (local name Abhali)
11. Dendrobium barbatulum (Bharangee)
12. Dioscorea bulbifera (local name dukkar kanda)
13. Dipcadi montanum (Deepkadee)
14. Drosera burmanni (local name Davbindu)
15. Drosera indica (local name Gavati Davbindu - गवती दवबिंदू)
16. Elaeocarpus glandulosus (local name Kaasa)
17. Exacum tetragonum (local name Udi chirayat)
18. Flemingia nilgheriensis
19. Habenaria grandifloriformis
20. Habenaria heyneana (local name toothbrush Orchid)
21. Habenaria longicorniculata
22. Habenaria panchganiensis
23. Hitchenia caulina (local name Chavar)
24. Impatiens oppositifolia
25. Ipomoea barlerioides
26. Linum mysurense (local name Undri)
27. Memecylon umbellatum (local name Anjani)
28. Murdannia lanuginosa (local name Abolima)
29. Murdannia simplex (local name Nilima)
30. Nymphoides indicum (local name Kumudini)
31. Oberonia recurva
32. Paracaryopsis coelestina (local name Nisurdi)
33. Paracaryopsis malbarica (local name Kali Nisurdi)
34. Pinda concanensis (local name Pinda)
35. Pogostemon deccanensis
36. Rotala fimbriata
37. Rotala ritchiei (local name Paner)
38. Senecio bombyensis (local name Sonki)
39. Senecio grahami / bombayensis (Sonakee - सोनकी)
40. Smithia agharkarii
41. Smithia hirsute / hirsuta (local name Kavala - कवळा)
42. Trichosanthes tricuspidata (local name Kondal)
43. Utricularia purpurascens (Seetechee aasawe - सीतेची आसवे)
44. Vigna vexillata (local name Halunda)
45. Wild Brinjal flower (kaaTe ringaNii - काटे रिंगणी)

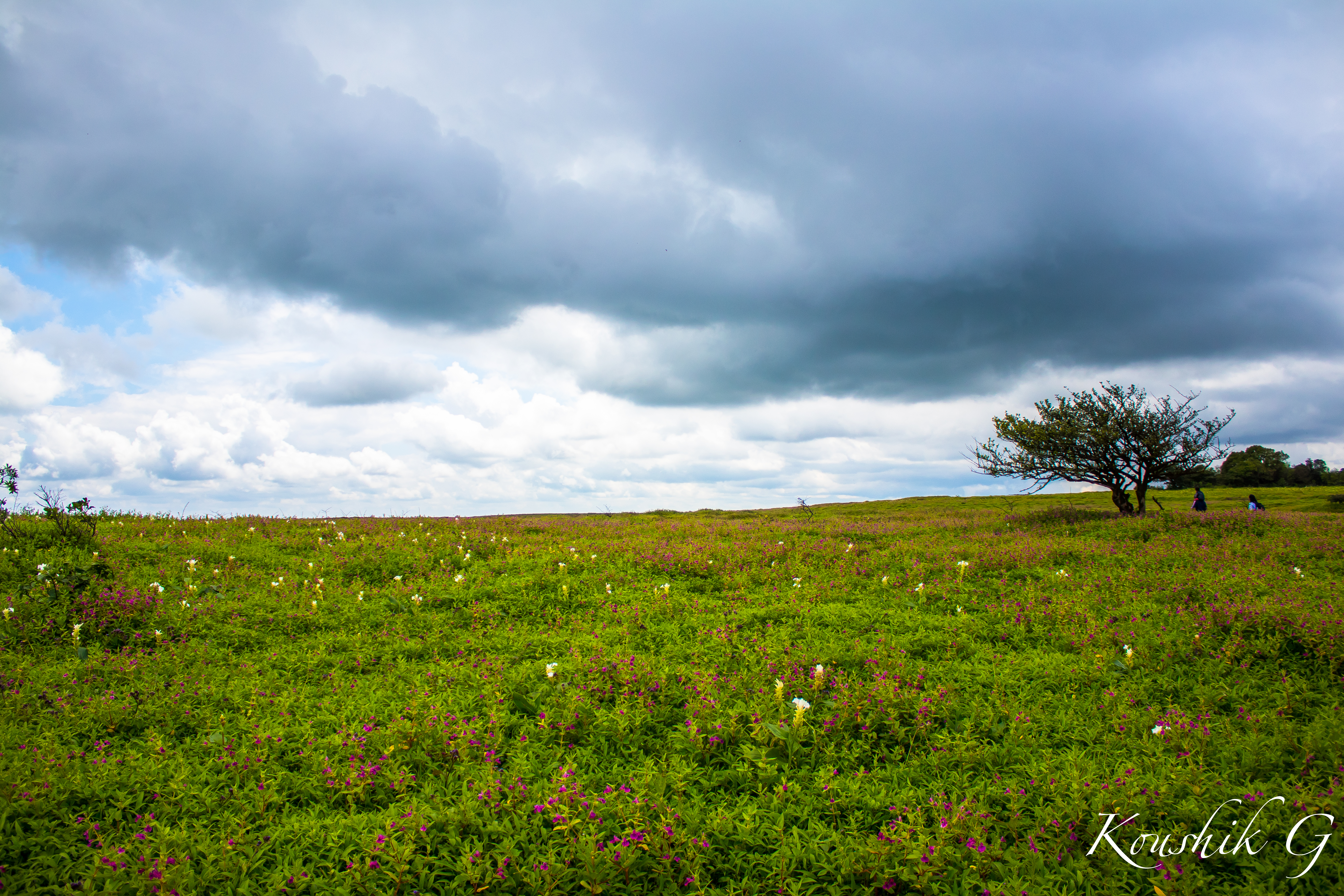
Kas Pathar

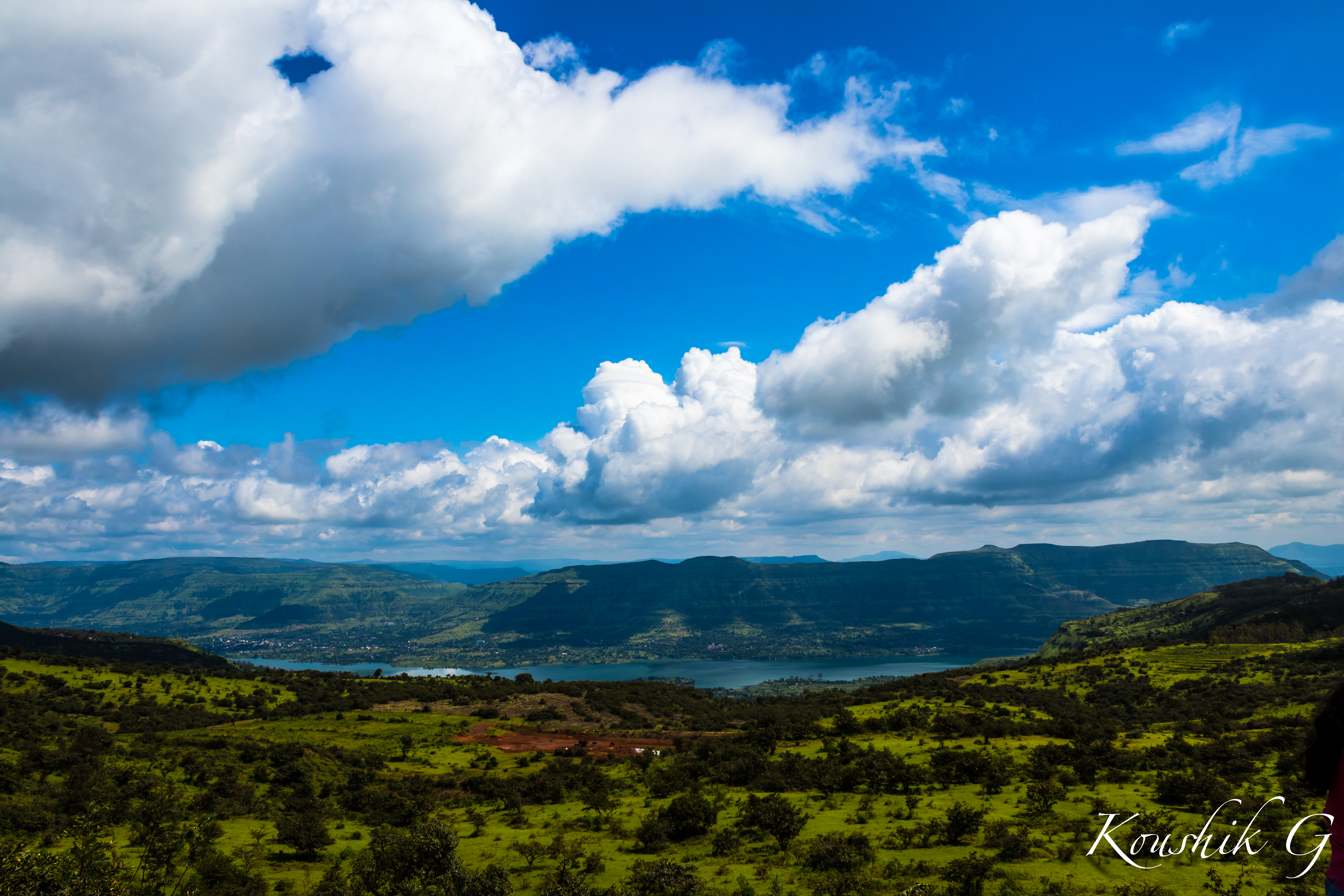
Kas Pathar

== Gallery ==
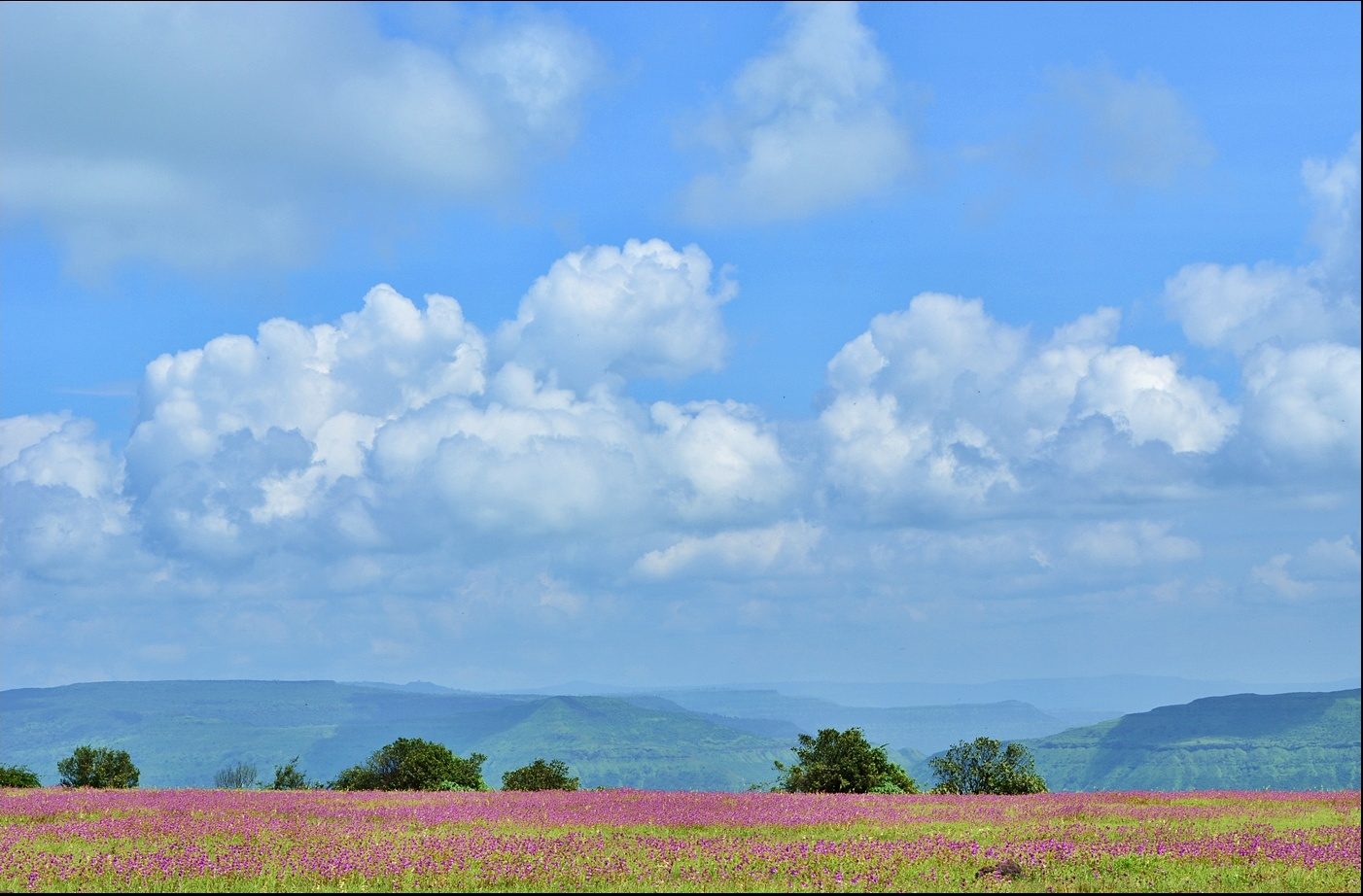
Monsoon flowers

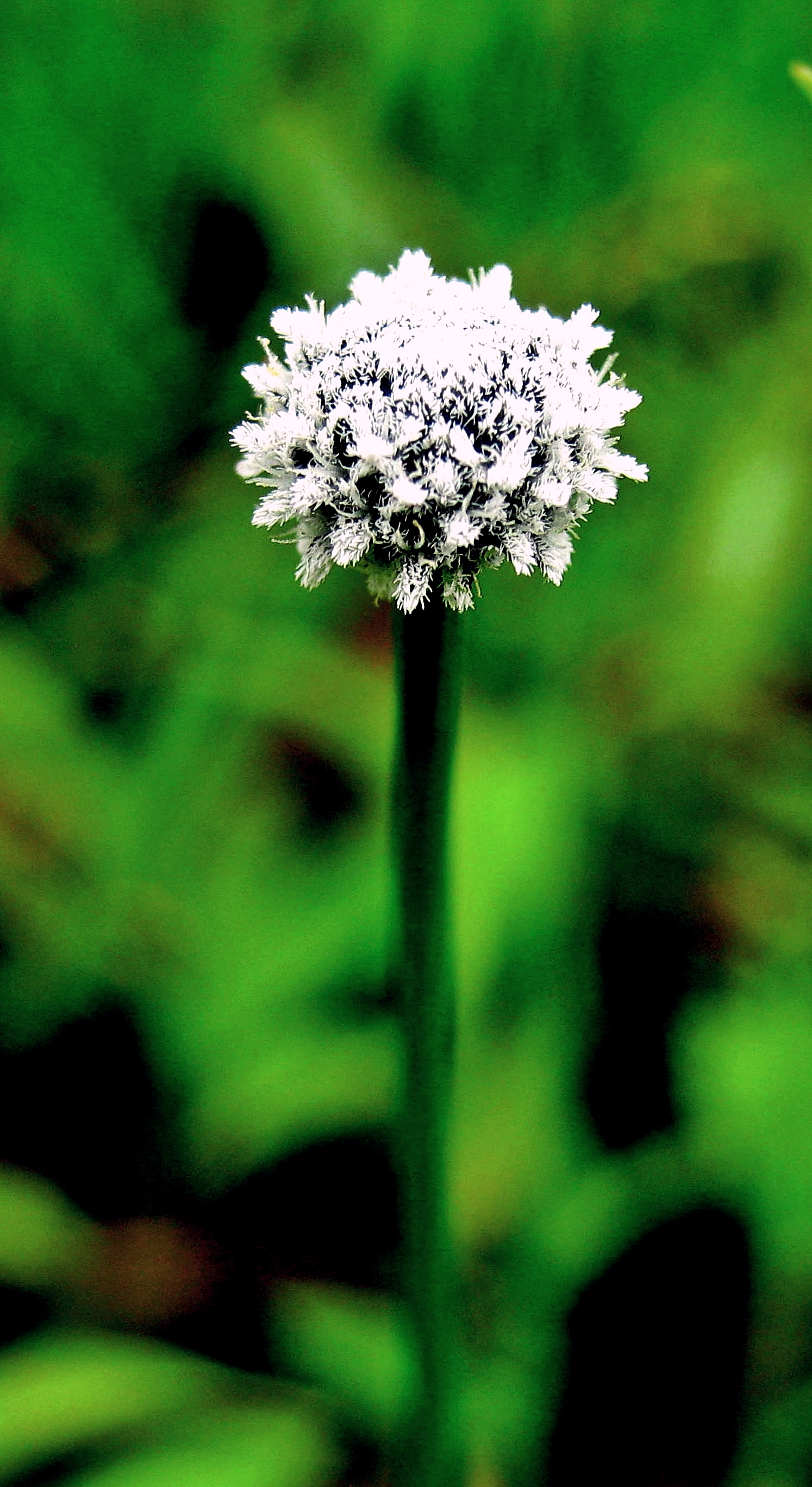
Kas Flowers

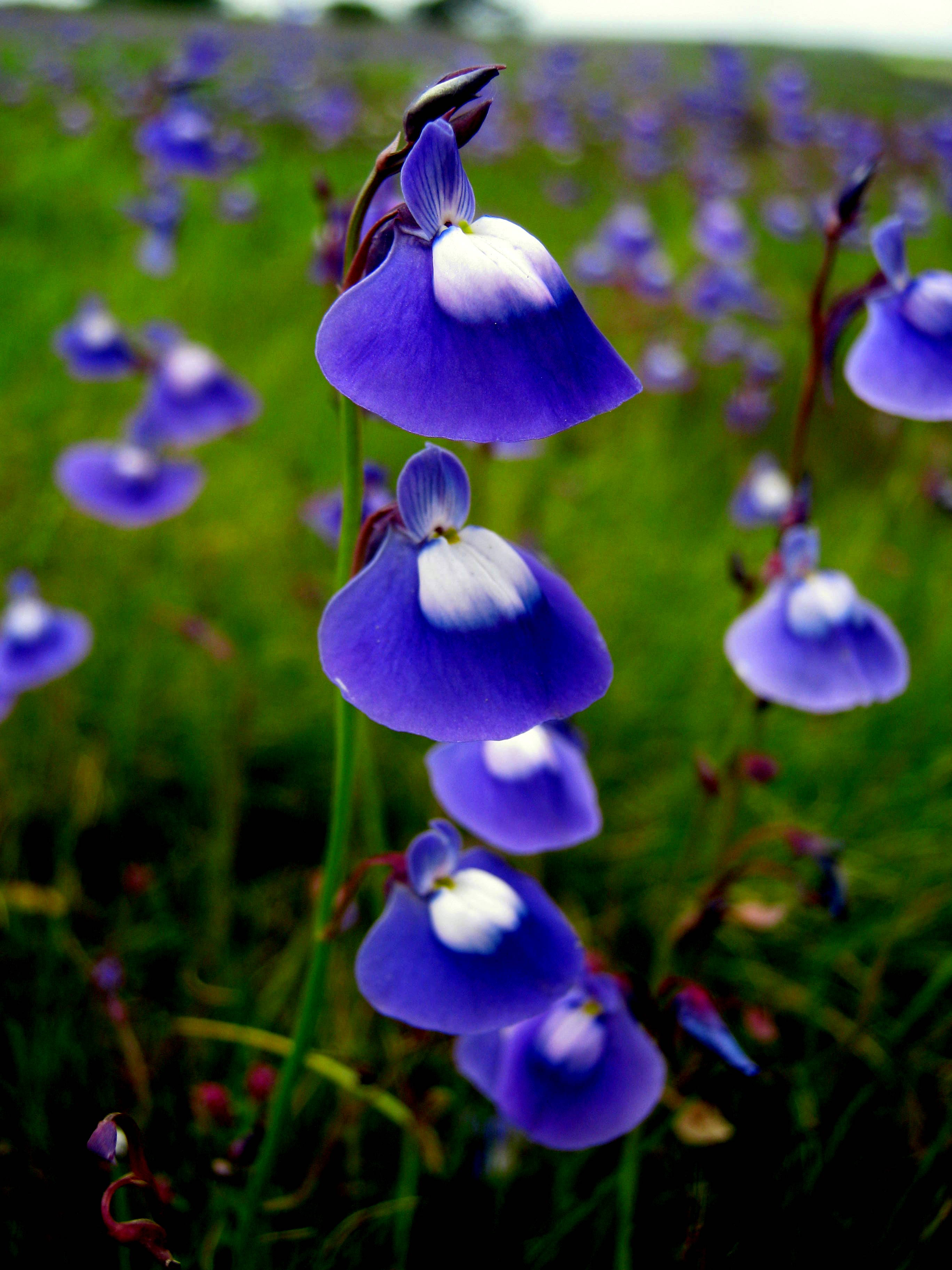
Utricularia arcuata at Kas

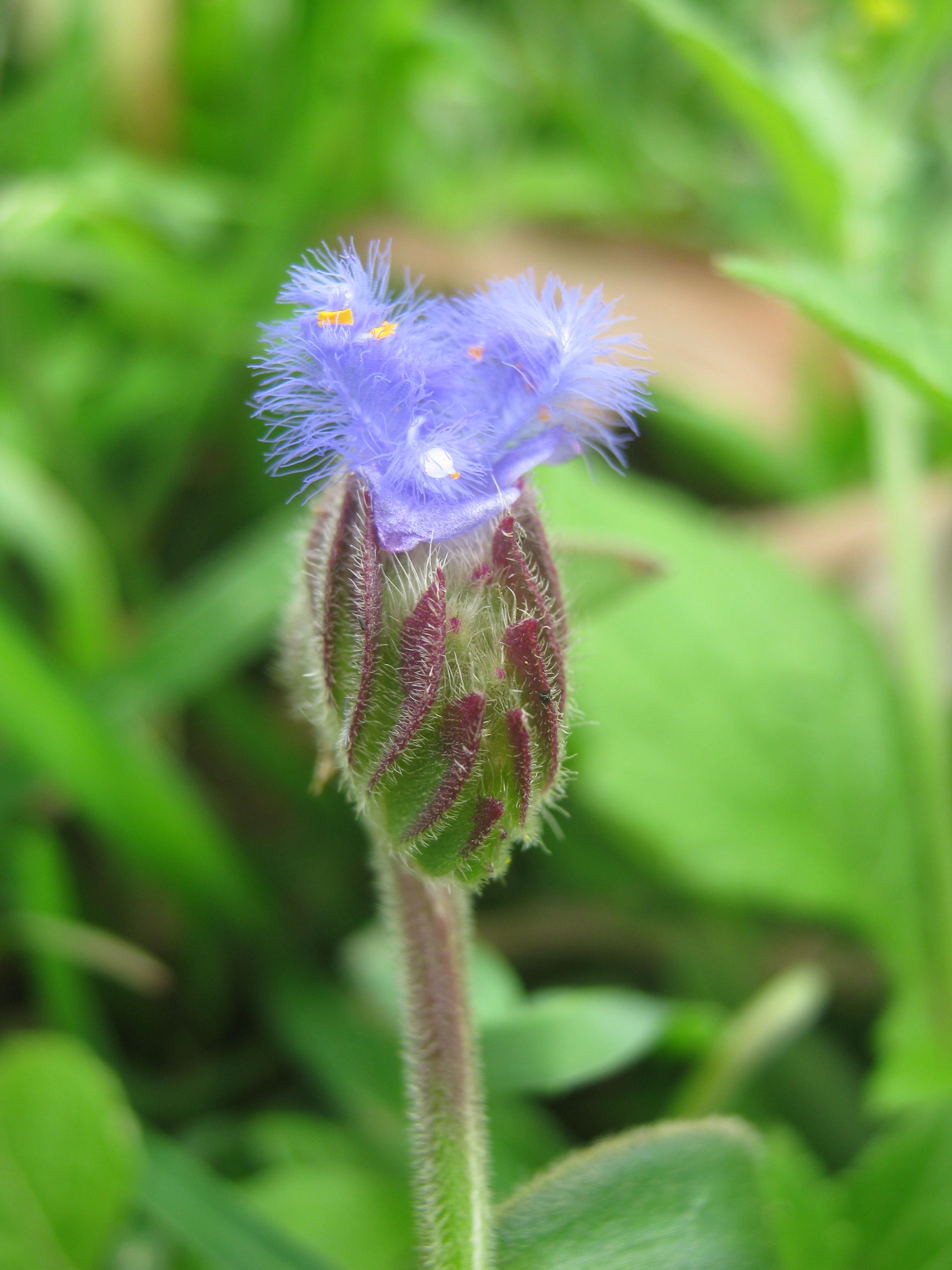
Kas Flowers

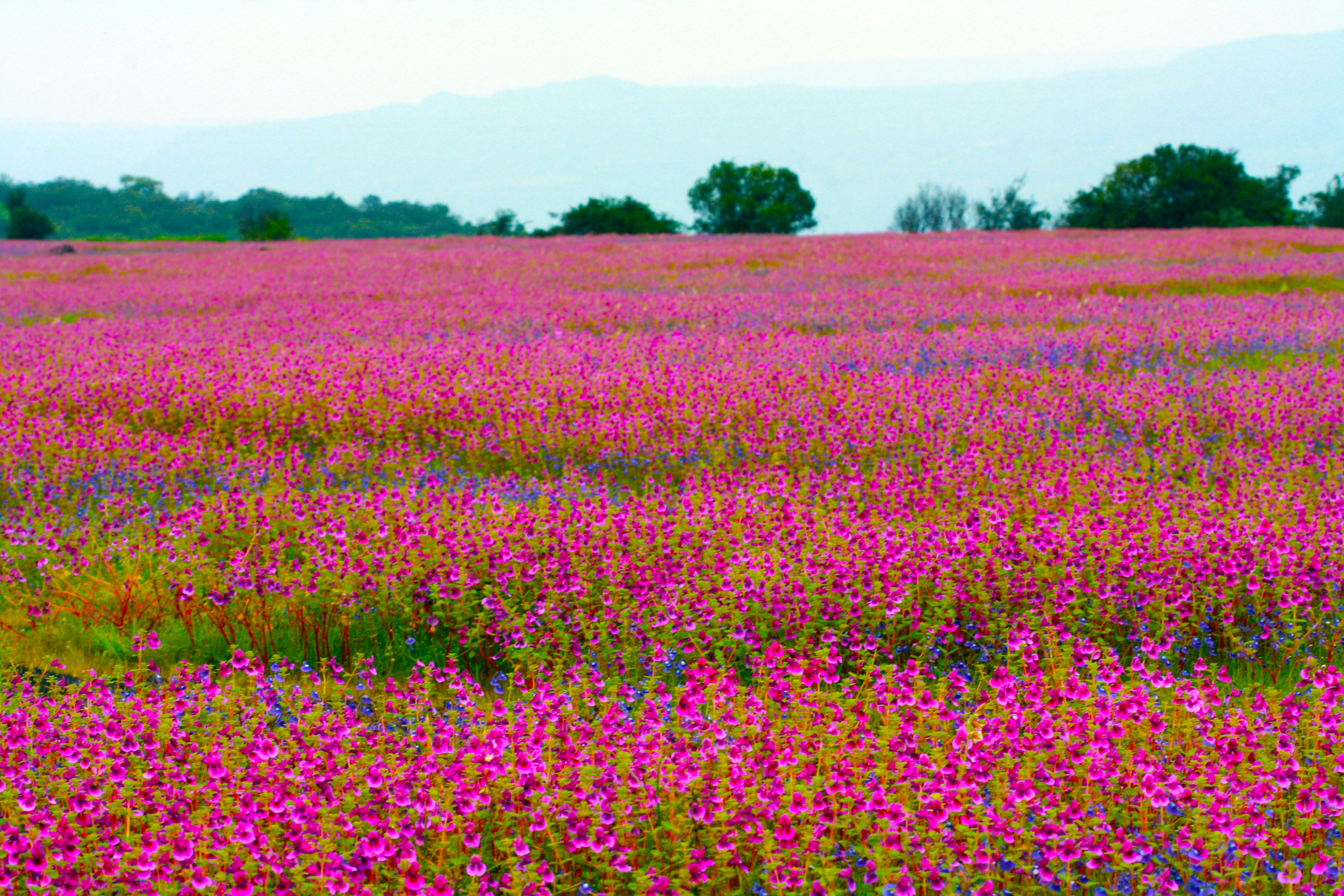
Kas Flowers

== Threats to the ecosystem ==
The plateau was always under local pressures of grazing and burning. Domestic cattle compete to a certain extent with wild mammals. Disturbance was also caused by the road that passes through the plateau. Many road kills of snakes have been reported. Addition of dung leads to eutrophication. Heavy trampling by cattle and people has created many paths on the plateau. It is not possible to judge the impact of these activities on the plateau diversity, as no baseline data is available. Recent popularity and sudden growth in tourism are at present the most serious threats, not only to the plateau but also to the surrounding areas. The alarming rise in the number of tourists became a serious concern since 2008. The easily visible ecological impacts of tourism are high levels of vegetation trampling, microhabitat damage and solid waste problem. The not so easily visible impacts are changing land-use in the surrounding area, socio-economic and cultural changes in the surrounding villages. Both these are irreversible unless immediate measures are taken. A Joint Forest Management Committee has been constituted to manage tourist inflow. The most serious threat is the establishment of invasive weeds, which are introduced through foreign soils and can compete with the indigenous flora.
