= Apshinge =

Village in Maharashtra

Apshinge military
- village
- Location in Maharashtra, India Apshinge military (India)
- Coordinates: 17.34°N 74.04°E
- Country: India
- State: Maharashtra
- District: Satara district

Languages
  - Official: Marathi
- Time zone: UTC+5:30 (IST)
- PIN: 415518
- Nearest city: Satara Taluka.

Apshinge is a village in the Satara Taluka of Satara district in Maharashtra State, India. Apshinge Military is another variation for the same name. The name was given by the British for the village's contribution to the armed forces.

== Notability ==
Apshinge Military is a small village in Satara district but it has historical significance as at least one member of every family in the village has served or is serving in the armed forces. The contribution of the village was recognised by the British government, which installed a memorial in the village in the memory of 46 soldiers who laid down their lives fighting for Britain during World War I.

According to available records, the village had lost its 46 soldiers in World War I. Post Independence, soldiers from Apshinge Military village have participated in all wars that India fought. It lost four soldiers in 1962 war against China, two soldiers in 1965 war against Pakistan and one soldier in 1971 war, which was again fought against Pakistan.
