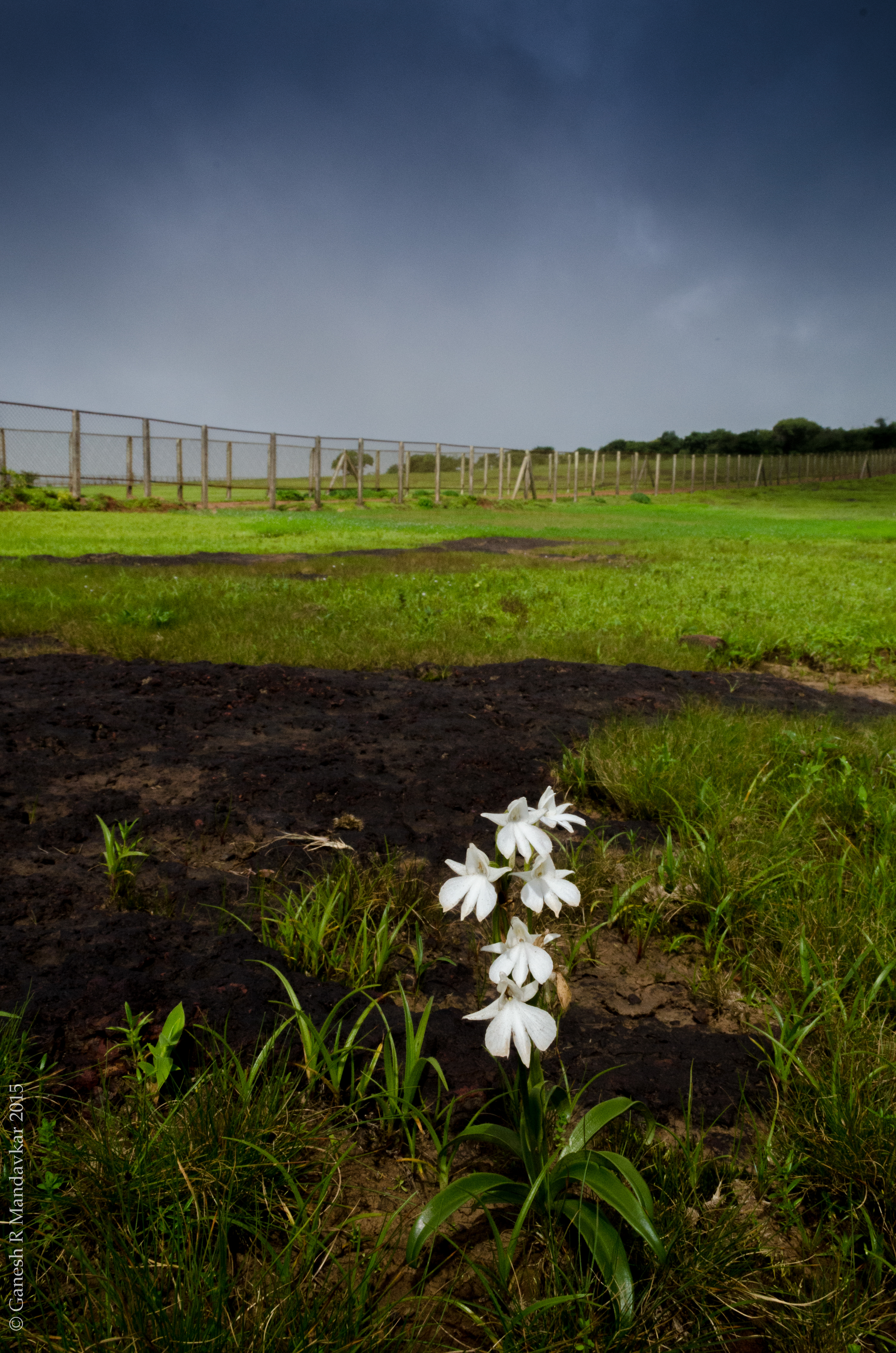
- H. suaveolens growing on the Kaas plateau in India

Conservation status
- CITES Appendix II

Scientific classification
- Kingdom: Plantae
- Clade: Embryophytes
- Clade: Tracheophytes
- Clade: Angiosperms
- Clade: Monocots
- Order: Asparagales
- Family: Orchidaceae
- Subfamily: Orchidoideae
- Genus: Habenaria
- Species: H. suaveolens

Binomial name
- Habenaria suaveolens Dalzell

Synonyms
- Habenaria variabilis Blatt. & McCann; Habenaria panchganiensis Santapau & Kapadia; Plantaginorchis suaveolens (Dalzell) Szlach. & Kras-Lap.; Pecteilis suaveolens (Dalzell) M.A.Clem. & D.L.Jones

= Habenaria suaveolens =

Species of orchid

Habenaria suaveolens is a species of orchid that is native to western India. The species was first collected and described by Dalzell who obtained specimens from the Konkan region and Bababudan Hills of Karnataka.

The species grows exclusively on exposed lateritic rocky plateaus with minimal soil, and flowers during the monsoon (June-September). The species has a narrow distribution range in the Western Ghat mountains found only in a few locations in Maharashtra, Goa and Karnataka states.

Two other orchids that were thought to be distinct species, H. variabilis and H. panchganiensis, were subsequently found to be conspecific to H. suaveolens.

The species was once common on the Panchgani plateau and has declined greatly due to disturbance caused by tourism.
