= Thoseghar Waterfalls =

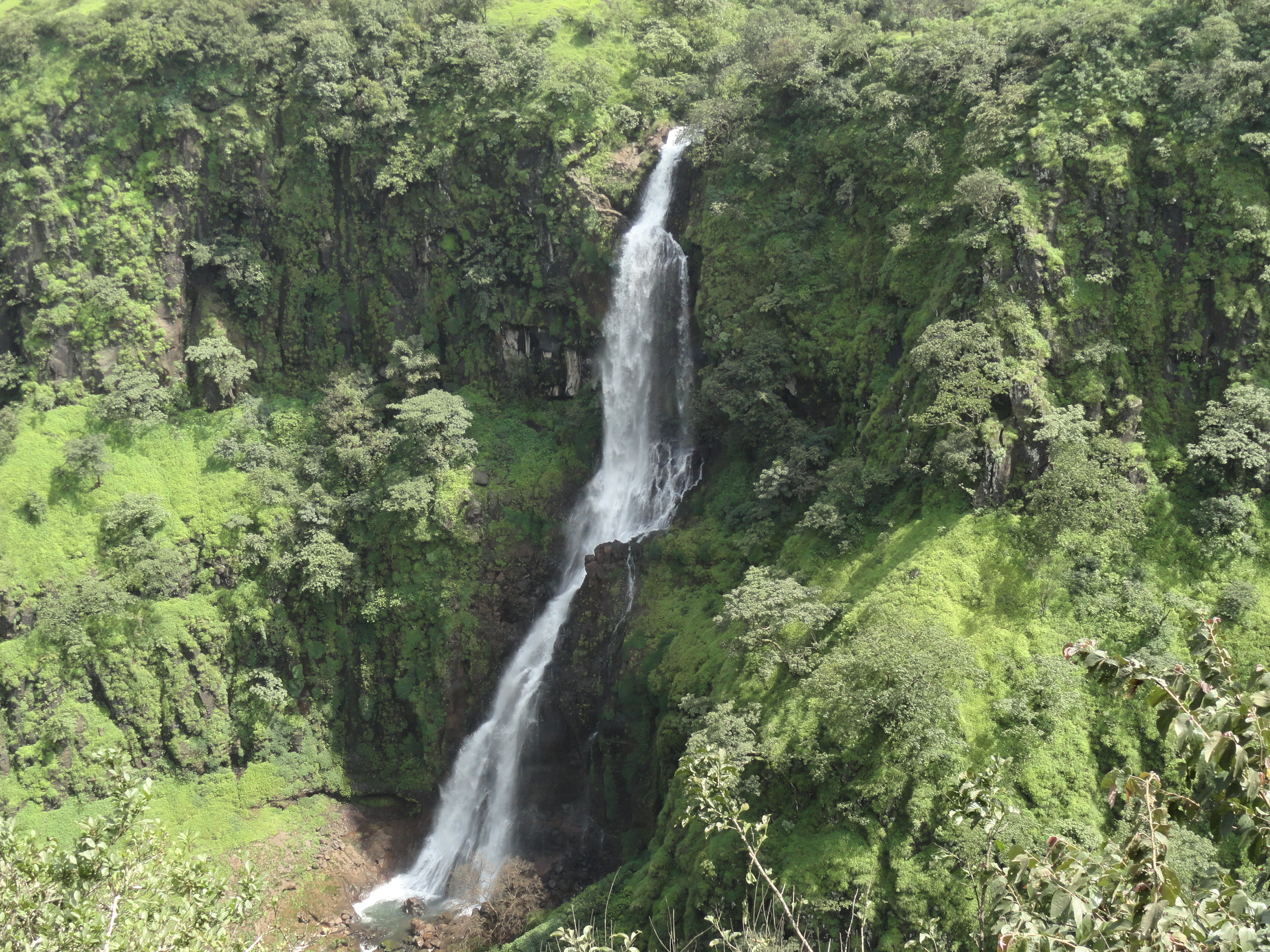
- Thoseghar Waterfalls during monsoon

- Location within Maharashtra
- Location: Thoseghar, Satara, Maharashtra, India
- Coordinates: 17°35′47.84″N 73°50′44.98″E
- Type: Cataract, segmented

Thoseghar waterfalls is a scenic spot located near the small village of Thoseghar, 20 km from Satara city, at the edge of the Konkan region, in Western India. There are a series of waterfalls, some of them 15 to 20 metres and one of approx 200 metres in height. People come from all over Maharashtra to visit the area, especially during the rainy or monsoon season, July to November. Heavy rain falls during that season and because of this the falls have more water and are more spectacular. The immediate area is calm and quiet, with a clean lake and dark woods in a hilly area.

== Description ==
There is a picnic area and a newly constructed platform which gives a good view of the waterfall. This platform can be entered in the valley, but it is not safe to do so when it is raining heavily. One can spot many birds near the waterfall. People visit from all over to visit the Thoseghar Waterfalls especially during the rainy or monsoon season. Heavy rain falls during that season and because of this the falls have more water and are more spectacular.

== Transport connectivity ==
Thoseghar waterfalls can be reached using public transport, or by driving. There are regular buses from Swargate (Pune to Satara) and buses or rickshaws from Satara. A full view of the falls can be obtained by going to Chalkewadi where one can park their vehicles at a newly designated parking lot and then walking down the paved road for 0.5 km.

== See also ==
- List of waterfalls
- List of waterfalls in India
- List of waterfalls in India by height
