= Satara-Akluj-Latur Highway =

Road in Maharashtra, India

National Highway 63

Route information
- Maintained by NHAI
- Length: 321 km (199 mi)

Major junctions
- From: Satara
- To: Latur

Location
- Country: India
- States: Maharashtra
- Major cities: Satara, Mhaswad, Malshiras, Akluj, Barshi Latur

Highway system
- Roads in India; Expressways; National; State; Asian

Satara–Malshiras-Akluj-Barshi-Latur Highway is a national highway in the state of Maharashtra. This is a part of the Marathwada Integrated Road Development Project launched by the Government of Maharashtra and Chief Minister Mr. Devendra Fadnavis.

== Development ==
Express Highway, based on the govt approval and the formal announcement by state govt authorities, this highway is a project connecting two major cities Satara & Latur in Maharashtra to the NH 52 via the same link-route and in less time than the SH 77. Though said so, if developed with 2 lane basis, as declared earlier by the State Public Works Dept., this highway can save more than 1.5 hrs of time between Latur and Mumbai.

Though approved on 18 Nov 2015, its major development would be started in early 2017 and it would be completed by the end of 2020. The Satara–Akluj sector has already started with a full flow of traffic, while the Tembhurni–Yedshi–Latur sector is still under construction and expected to be completed soon (by the end of 2020). It is expected to share the major direct road traffic between these cities, including all traffic from SH 77 and SH 3.

== Importance of the project ==
- It will boost the industrial growth in Satara district, especially in drought-prone areas of Pusegaon, Mhaswad.
- The length passes through backward regions of Marathwada.
- The time from Latur to Mumbai will be reduced by 1.5 hrs.
- It will reduce travel time considerably and will be cost effective.
- It connects Industrial places at Satara, Yedshi, Latur.
- It connects Tourist places such as Satara, Yedshi and Latur.
- It will boost employment through development of industries in backward regions.

== Built and development ==
Though this is a state highway, it is built on the National Highway basis. A list of national highways in India by highway number is available, as is the list of state highways in Maharashtra.

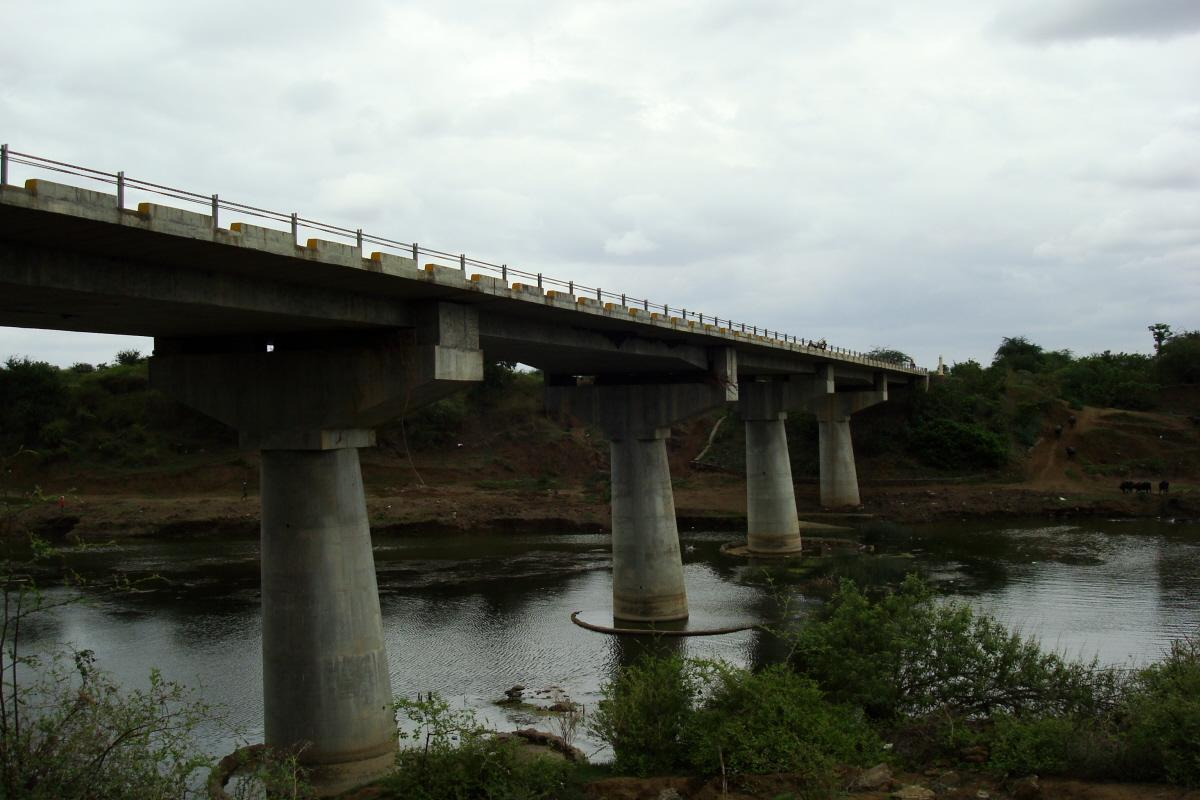
Manjara River over-bridge on highway near Latur

The Highway is just 10% completed throughout and the remaining work is supposed to be done by the end of 2020. Maharashtra govt is trying to operate this highway through a private party for a period of over 30 years in order to recover the cost of this highway.

=== Major cities bypassed ===
This highway bypasses the other major cities in Maharashtra state, on SH 77 and on SH 3, though it passes through their areas. It directly connects Yedshi to Osmanabad.

=== Passing through districts areas ===
This highway passes through 4 districts of Maharashtra:

- Satara district
- Solapur district
- Osmanabad district and
- Latur district

== Covered regions and area ==
The total length of this highway is 321 kilometres (199 mi), from Satara to Latur, excluding the portions of SH 77 and SH 3 it covers at Nanded and Latur–Yedshi sectors respectively. This highway also covers the part portions of the Maharashtra State Highways at certain areas, which are now being rebuilt with National Highway Standards.

== Major route ==
Its major route is as follows:

Satara – (via SH77)–Koregaon–Mhaswad–Malshiras–Akluj–Tembhurni–Kurduwadi–Barshi–Yedshi–Dhoki–Latur

== Junctions ==
- At Satara with NH 48 connecting Kolhapur–Belgaon
- At Tembhurni with NH 65 connecting Solapur–Pune
- At Yedshi with NH 52 connecting Solapur–Aurangabad–Dhule
- From Latur to Yedshi via SH 77
- From Yedshi to Tembhurni with NH 465
- At Latur with NH 361 connecting Tuljapur–Yavatmal–Nagpur
- At Latur with NH 52 connecting Ambajogai–Kaij–Beed – Aurangabad–Dhule–Vadodara

== Trivia ==
- This highway covers the portions of:
  - 70 km on SH 77 from Latur to Yedshi.

== See also ==
- List of national highways in India
