= Hari Makaji Naik =

Indian freedom fighter (died 1879)

Hari Makaji Naik Nayak
- Born: Hari Makaji; Kalambi village, Satara district, Bombay Presidency, British India
- Died: March 1879; Jejuri jail, Jejuri, Bombay Presidency, British India, Asia
- Cause of death: Hanged to death
- Other name: Hutatma Hari Makaji Naik
- Citizenship: Indian
- Occupation: Agriculturist
- Years active: 1877-1879
- Era: British era
- Successor: Tantya Makaji Naik
- Movement: Indian Independence movement
- Opponent: British Indian Army
- Criminal charges: Thuggee; Robbery; Murder; Blackmailing; Threatening
- Criminal penalty: Hanged to death
- Relatives: Tantiya Makaji Naik (brother)

Hari Makaji Naik was an Indian freedom activist from Koli caste of Maharashtra who challenged the British rule in India. He was Koli by caste but led the Ramoshis of Satara, attacking British offices, revenue centers and officials in the Pune, Satara and Solapur districts of Bombay Presidency.

Hari Makaji along with his brother Tantia Makaji, attacked at police station of Satara where four of revolutionaries were killed and seven of police constables killed and one officer was wounded in right hand. In 1879, Hari Makaji committed fifty nine times plundering in Poona against British government. In January 1879, revolutionary army under Hari Makaji raided Poona fifteen times, then Satara many times after that, In February 1879, Hari Makaji attacked a portion of Bhimthadi in Baramati. On the eighth raid into Baramati, Hari Makaji was attacked by British troops, but escaped, fighting hand to hand with two British policemen. He wounded them, but two revolutionaries were captured. At the beginning of March, Hari Makaji again rose, revolted and raided Indapur but was captured in Solapur in mid-March. Tatya Makaji led his revolution until the end of the year, raiding villages on the Purandar and Sinhagad ranges.

== Death ==
In March 1879, Hari Makaji was captured in Sholapur by British troops. He was tried in court and sentenced to death by jury and hanged in Jejuri.

== Tribute ==
- Government of Maharashtra built a public park or garden in Jejuri city named Hutatma Hari Makaji Naik memorial.

== See also ==
- Deccan Riots
