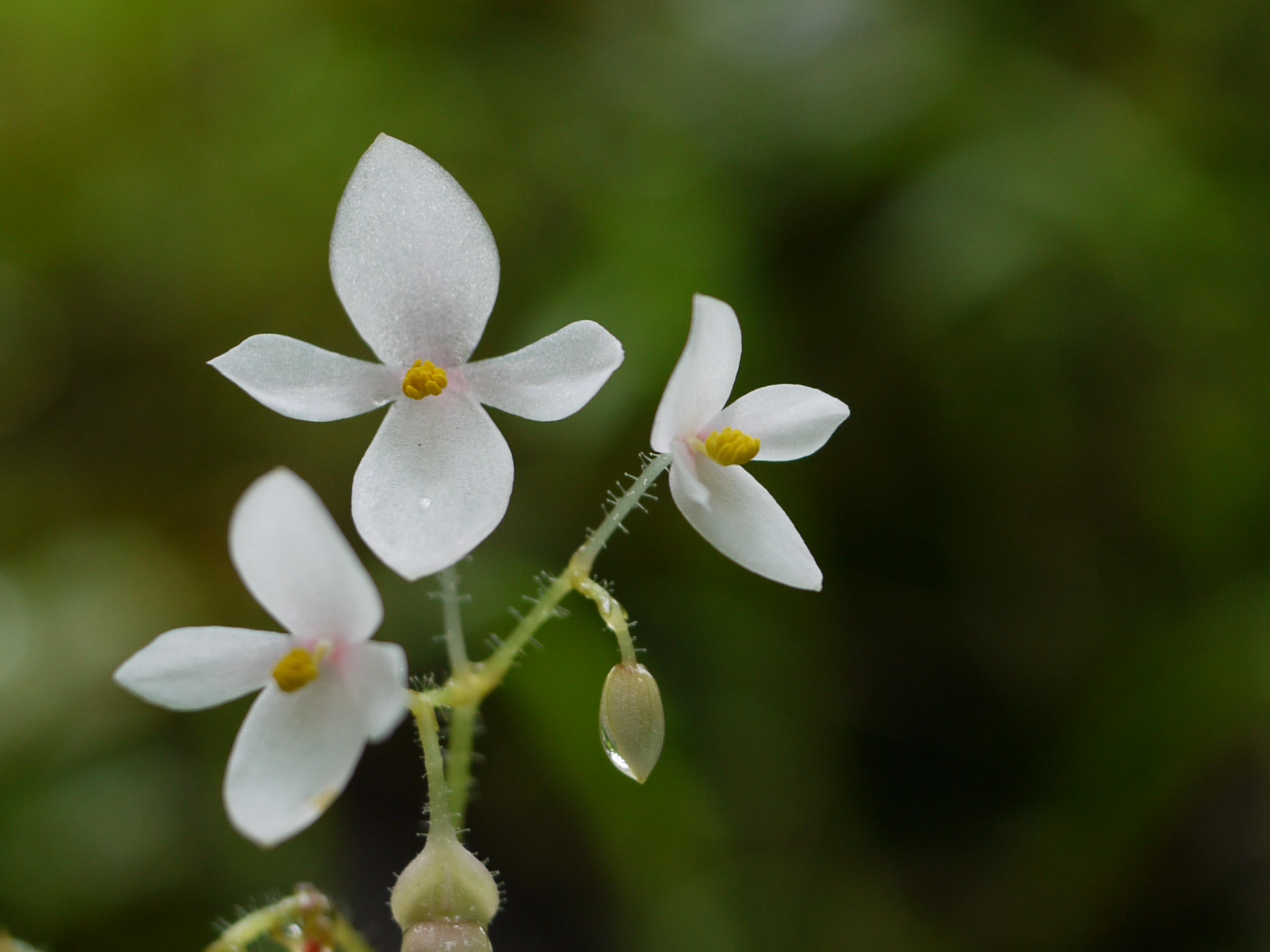

Scientific classification
- Kingdom: Plantae
- Clade: Tracheophytes
- Clade: Angiosperms
- Clade: Eudicots
- Clade: Rosids
- Order: Cucurbitales
- Family: Begoniaceae
- Genus: Begonia
- Species: B. crenata

Binomial name
- Begonia crenata Dryand.

= Begonia crenata =

Species of flowering plant

Begonia crenata is a species of plant in the family Begoniaceae.

== Description ==
Succulent herbs, 10–15 cm tall, with tuberous rootstocks. Leaves 1–4 in number, measuring 1.4–8.2 × 1.2–7 cm, ovate to suborbicular in shape. Inflorescence a terminal cyme. Flowers pinkish and monoecious; male flowers about 0.7 cm long, female flowers about 1.5 cm long. Capsules 0.7 × 0.7 cm, membranous, and three-winged. Seeds minute and ellipsoid.
