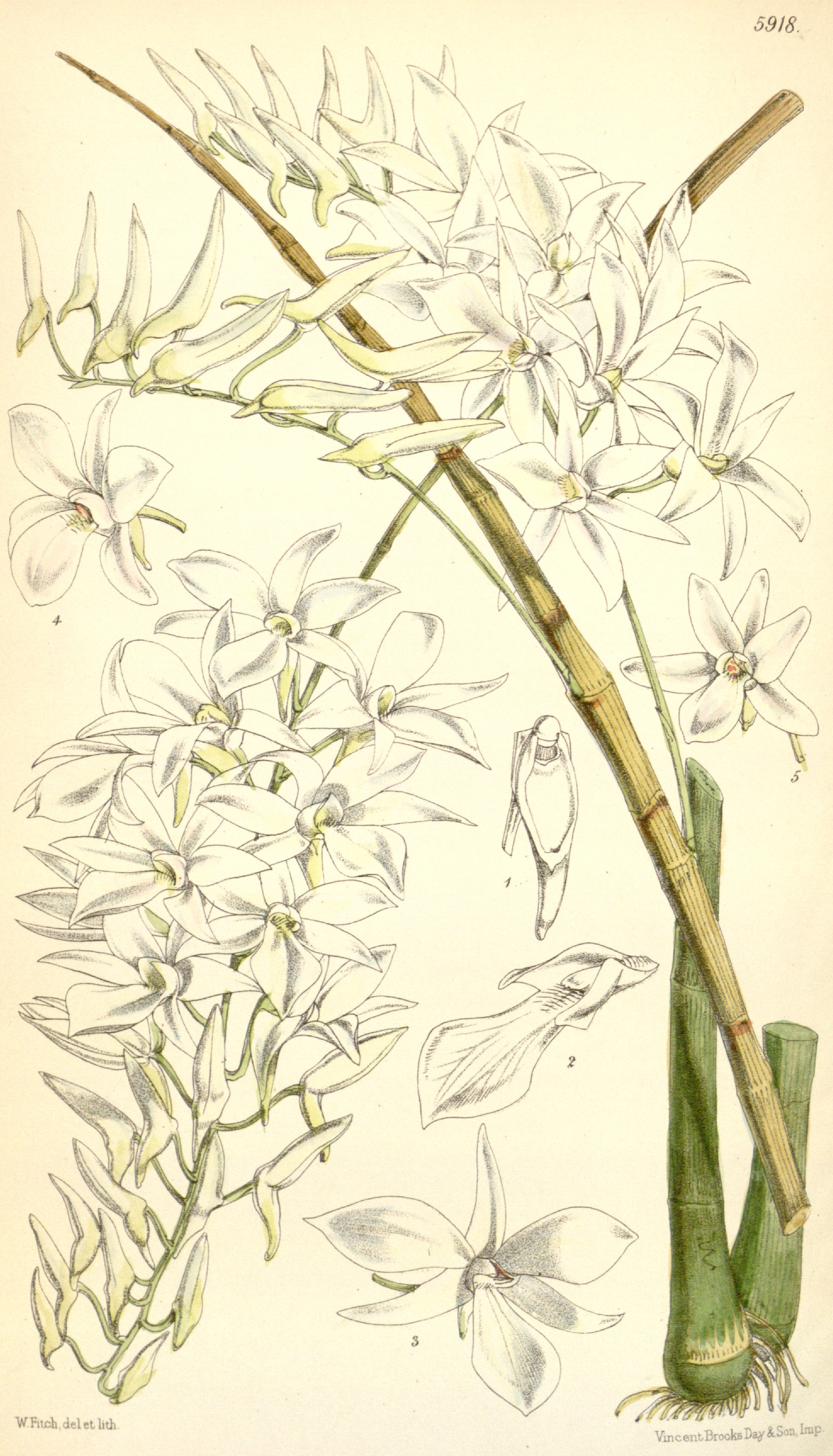
- 1871 illustration

Scientific classification
- Kingdom: Plantae
- Clade: Tracheophytes
- Clade: Angiosperms
- Clade: Monocots
- Order: Asparagales
- Family: Orchidaceae
- Subfamily: Epidendroideae
- Genus: Dendrobium
- Species: D. barbatulum

Binomial name
- Dendrobium barbatulum Lindl. (1830)

Synonyms
- Callista barbatula (Lindl.) Kuntze (1891)

= Dendrobium barbatulum =

Small-bearded dendrobium

Species of orchid

Dendrobium barbatulum (small-bearded dendrobium) is a species of orchid endemic to southern India.
