= Satara (city) =

- City
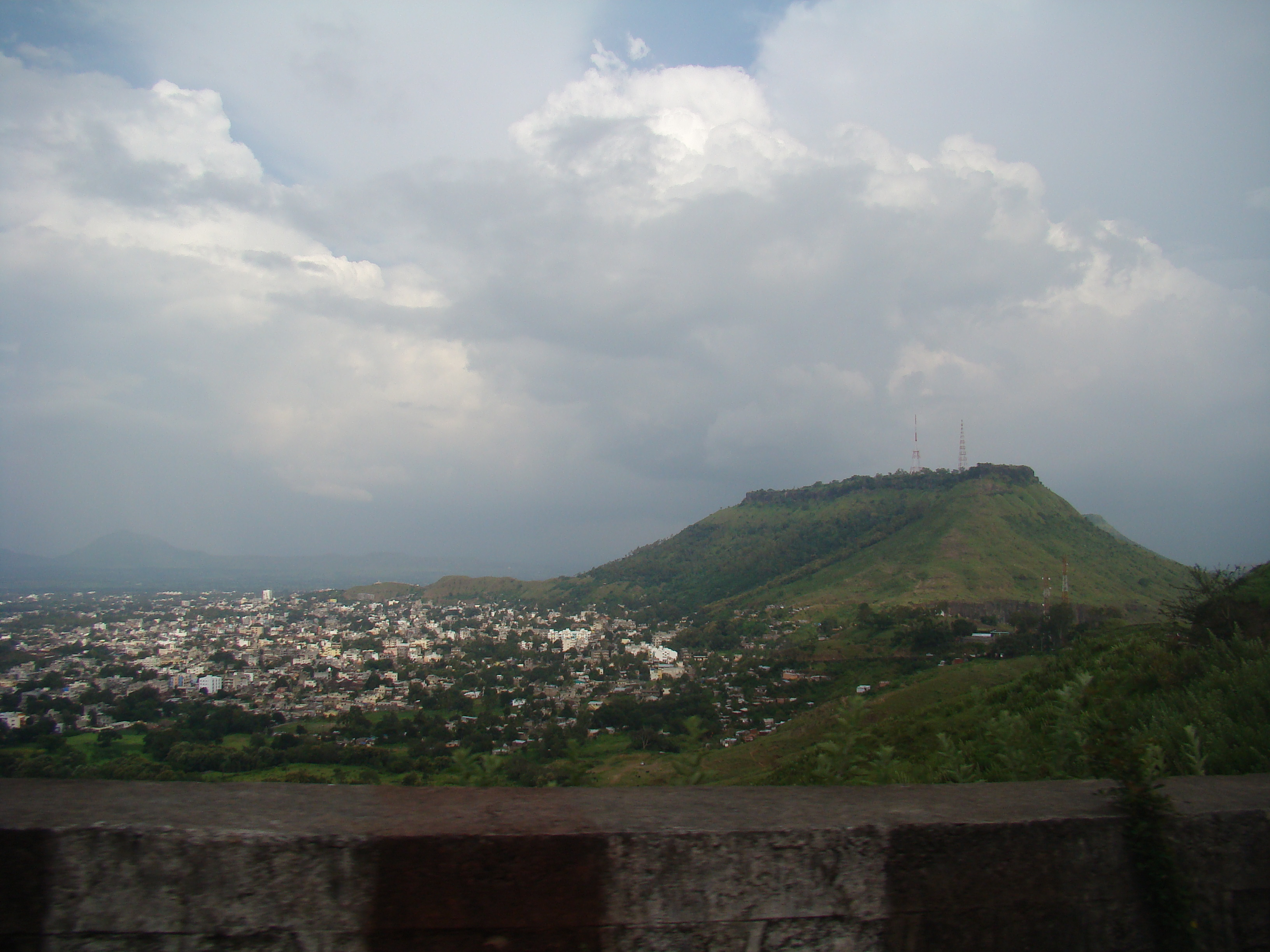
- View of Ajinkyatara Fort above the city of Satara, Maharashtra
- Satara in Maharashtra
- Coordinates: 17.688°N 74.006°E
- Country: India
- State: Maharashtra
- District: Satara
- Established: 16th century
- Founder: Shahu I
- Named for: 'Saat Tara' or Saat Tare meaning Seven Stars denoting the seven hill forts in the adjoining areas of the city

Government
  - Type: Municipal Council
  - Body: Satara Municipal Council

Area
  - Total: 22.42 km^{2} (8.66 sq mi)
- Elevation: 742 m (2,434 ft)

Population (2011)
  - Total: 137,283 (2011)
- Demonym: Satarkar

Language
  - Official: Marathi
- Time zone: UTC+5:30 (IST)
- PIN: 415001, 415002, 415003, 415004, 415005, 415006
- Telephone code: 02162
- Vehicle registration: MH-11
- Website: sataranp.in

Satara (ISO: Sātārā) is a city located in the Satara District of Maharashtra state of India, near the confluence of the river Krishna and its tributary, the Venna. The city was established in the 16th century and was the seat of the Chhatrapati of the Maratha Empire, Shahu I.

It is the headquarters of Satara Tehsil, as well as the Satara District. The city gets its name from the seven forts (Sat-Tara) which are around the city. The city is known as a Soldier's city as well as Pensioner's city. The city had a population of 179,147 in 2011.

== History ==
Raja bhoj II of Shilahara dynasty constructed a fort here between 1178 AD and 1193 AD around which the city was later founded, Shilaharas fell to Seuna (Yadava) dynasty of Devgiri in 1212 AD. Popular among locals, temple of Yavateshwar was built during yadava rule in Hemadpanti style. During rule of Bijapur Sultanate, Ali Adil Shah I's wife Chand Bibi was imprisoned by Kishvar Khan at Satara fort as she conspired against him to seize power after her husband's death. In May 1673, Chhatrapati Shivaji Maharaj conquered Parali(now Sajjangad) and the Satara fort in September of the same year from Bijapur.After which Manaji Sable served as kiledar of Satara and defended the fort when it was attacked by second son of Aurangzeb Muhammad Mu'azzam.

After the death of Chhatrapati Sambhaji (Son of Chhatrpati Shivaji Maharaj) in 1689, Marathas under Rajaram I had to retreat to south India for survival. and hence Jinji in Tamilnadu became the Maratha capital but when Chhatrapati Rajaram returned to Maharashtra in 1698, he declared Satara as the Maratha capital. He then left Satara for campaign and left the fort to Prayagji Prabhu. On 8 December 1699 Aurangzeb advanced towards Satara and sieged the fort with Tarbiyat khan in south, Sarjekhan in east, Aurangzeb's son Azam Shah in Shahapur in the west and Aurangzeb himself in Karanje in the north. Parshuram pant Pratinidhi managed to send food grain supplies through Parali fort by bribing Azam Shah. Marathas defended the fort for 6 months but news of chh.Rajaram's death demoralized the troops on Satara fort and in April Tarbiyat khan dug trenches under Bastion named Manglai, killing a few Marathas and injuring Prayagji Prabhu, this compelled them to handover the fort. It was later recaptured by Marathas in 1706.

Chhatrapati Shahu Maharaj I Shahu, heir apparent to the Maratha Empire, was captured by Mughals when he was only seven years old at Raigad.He remained their prisoner until the death of Aurangzeb in 1707.

The dowager Maharani Tarabai proclaimed her son, Shahu's younger half-brother Shahu Sambhaji, as the Chhatrapati Maharaj under her regency. The Mughals released Shahu with intentions sparking a Maratha civil war in 1707. The Marathas would face an internal war for the throne. Shahu returned to the Maratha+ Kingdom and claimed his inheritance.

In 1707, Chattrapati Shahu, the son of Chhatrapati Sambhaji, won Battle of Khed and eventually reached Satara and was crowned Chhatrapati at the Satara fort, later Satara city being his capital. He then went on to rule the Maratha Empire for 42 years, expanding his empire in a large part of India. He was responsible for establishing 13 pethas of Satara city, he also established city of Shahunagar at eastern base of Satara fort, where the throne was later kept. The gaadi(throne)was first kept at Satara fort, he brought it down to the city as the war was over and safety was assured. During his rule Satara was at peak of its political influence and became quite prosperous. He did not have a son so he nominated Tarabai's grandson Rajaram II as heir to the maratha throne. In 1750 due to internal struggle Tarabai imprisoned Chh.Rajaram II, Balaji Bajirao then sieged Satara fort and eventually managed to get her to sign a peace treaty. Treaty of Sangola was signed by Rajaram II ceding powers to Peshwa. Many offices of Maratha administration were transferred from Satara to Pune, Satara lost its political importance and Maratha empire became a confederacy after that. Loosely ruled Rajaram II until December 1777. He was heirless too and hence adopted Chh.Shahu II from Bhosales of Wavi, he ruled till 1808 and was succeeded by Chh.Pratapsinha I.Maratha empire fell to British East India company and Satara became a rump state. Last Maratha emperor Chh.Pratapsinh was accused and charged with treason against the British and his brother was made the king, and he did not have a son. Satara was the first state to be annexed by British Governor-General Dalhousie's policy of ‘Doctrine of Lapse’ in 1848.

A shadow government was established in Satara. during the Quit India movement.

=== Modern history ===
Post independence Satara became part of Bombay presidency based on linguistic reorganization. Satara holds significant political power, significantly influencing Maharashtra's political sphere.The direct descendants of Chhatrapati Shivaji continue to live in Satara. Chhatrapati Udayanraje Bhonsle is the 13th descendant of Shivaji.

== Geography ==
Satara is located at 17.68°N 73.98°E. It lies in the Satara District. Satara city is surrounded by seven mountains. Satara lies on the slope of Ajinkyatara fort. It lies on the western side of the Deccan Plateau. Pune (110 km), Sangli (121 km), Kolhapur (122 km) and Solapur (263 km) are the main cities close to Satara. The city is surrounded by the tehsils of Koregaon on the West, Karad (51 km) and Patan on the South, Jawali on the East and Wai on the North.

National Highway 48 (formerly National Highway 4) passes through Satara, between Karad and Khandala. Kaas Plateau, a valley of flowers, is situated 25 km away from Satara .

The Satara District experiences earthquakes of minor magnitudes. the epicenter of these earthquakes are scattered in Patan Taluka.

Satara is famous for the Kaas Pathar, Thoseghar, and a lot of natural sites present in the vicinity of the city. Kass Plateau has been awarded as a UNESCO's World Heritage Site (WHS). In the monsoon months, the Kaas Pathar, as it is locally known, transforms into a wildflower wonderland. More particularly so in September when vivid shades of pink balsams, yellow Smithia flowers, and blue utricularias carpet the vast grasslands. It is a must-visit for serious botanists, amateur photographers to witness the spectrum of Western Ghats monsoon montane grasslands flora, some of which are rare and endangered.

=== Climate ===
Satara city has a tropical wet and dry climate (Köppen climate classification: Aw) that is influenced by the relatively high altitude and mountains surrounding the city. Summers are more hot than the winters. Satara city receives rainfall from 900 mm to 1,500 mm depending on the strength of the monsoon.

Climate data for Satara (1991–2020, extremes 1933–2020)
Month	Jan	Feb	Mar	Apr	May	Jun	Jul	Aug	Sep	Oct	Nov	Dec	Year
Record high °C (°F)	35.8 (96.4)	38.0 (100.4)	40.5 (104.9)	42.4 (108.3)	42.1 (107.8)	41.2 (106.2)	35.2 (95.4)	35.2 (95.4)	34.6 (94.3)	37.7 (99.9)	36.0 (96.8)	34.7 (94.5)	42.4 (108.3)
Mean daily maximum °C (°F)	30.5 (86.9)	32.9 (91.2)	36.2 (97.2)	38.1 (100.6)	37.4 (99.3)	30.9 (87.6)	27.3 (81.1)	26.9 (80.4)	29.2 (84.6)	31.4 (88.5)	31.1 (88.0)	30.2 (86.4)	31.8 (89.2)
Mean daily minimum °C (°F)	12.4 (54.3)	14.2 (57.6)	17.7 (63.9)	21.1 (70.0)	22.8 (73.0)	22.6 (72.7)	21.8 (71.2)	21.2 (70.2)	20.6 (69.1)	19.4 (66.9)	16.1 (61.0)	13.2 (55.8)	18.6 (65.5)
Record low °C (°F)	4.8 (40.6)	5.8 (42.4)	9.1 (48.4)	12.3 (54.1)	15.2 (59.4)	18.0 (64.4)	19.0 (66.2)	14.5 (58.1)	14.5 (58.1)	13.2 (55.8)	9.0 (48.2)	7.3 (45.1)	4.8 (40.6)
Average rainfall mm (inches)	0.8 (0.03)	0.3 (0.01)	5.8 (0.23)	13.9 (0.55)	27.7 (1.09)	194.5 (7.66)	238.1 (9.37)	194.6 (7.66)	120.2 (4.73)	112.7 (4.44)	21.6 (0.85)	5.1 (0.20)	935.2 (36.82)
Average rainy days	0.1	0.1	0.4	1.3	1.9	10.3	16.0	12.8	8.4	6.3	1.6	0.4	59.7
Average relative humidity (%) (at 17:30 IST)	37	30	28	33	43	70	78	79	71	58	48	42	52
Source 1: India Meteorological Department
Source 2: Government of Maharashtra

== Demographics ==
As of 2011 India census, Satara had a population of 120,079; 61,129 are males while 59,066 are females, thus males constituted 52% of the population and females 48%. Satara has an average literacy rate of 80%, higher than the national average of 74%: male literacy is 84%, and female literacy is 76%. In Satara, 10% of the population is under 6 years of age. Marathi is the native and most widely spoken language. Around 98.5% Speakers are Marathi. Hindi is spoken by 1.5% of the population.

Maharashtra state's sex ratio is 883 girls per 1000 boys, and Satara fares worse still at 881, in spite of the high level of literacy.

Religions in Satara city
Religion	Percent
Hindus	83.3%
Muslims	7.7%
Christian	4%
Jain	3.7%
Buddhist	1.3%
Others†	1%
Distribution of religions †Includes Sikhs (0.2%), Parsi (0.8%).

The population of Satara has crossed the municipal limits and actual urban agglomerate population 326,765. The city is surrounded with census towns viz. Khed, Godoli and Vilaspur. These census towns are considered as suburban of Satara city.

The nod for Satara city, limit expansion was given by Devendra Fadnavis then chief minister of Maharashtra on 16 September 2019. The matter was pending for 40 years. The city's border will be extended to NH4 towards east, to Ajinkyatara on the south, the whole region south to Venna River, Shahupuri, Sambhajinagar, Vilaspur and Dare Budruk grampanchayats will become a part of Satara city.

== Government and politics ==
Satara city falls under Satara Lok Sabha constituency, represented by MP Udayanraje Bhosale from the Bharatiya Janata Party. The city also elects an MLA from the Satara Vidhan Sabha constituency, represented by BJP's Shivendrasinh Abhayasinh Bhosale.

=== Civic administration ===
Satara is a Municipal Council city in district of Satara, Maharashtra. Satara Municipal Council, with population of about 1.2 lakh is Satara sub district's only municipal council located in Satara sub district of Satara district in the state Maharashtra in India. Total geographical area of Satara municipal council is 8 square km. Population density of the city is 14748 persons per square km.

The Satara city is divided into 39 wards for which elections are held every 5 years. Among them Satara Ward No 19 is the most populous ward with population of 4691 and Satara Ward No 23 is the least populous ward with population of 2206.

=== Civic utilities ===
Water from the Kaas lake is supplied to Satara city for drinking purposes. Maharashtra Jeevan Pradhikaran supplies water to Satara city. 19 MLD is supplied, but because of water leakage during transmission, only 17.2 MLD gets supplied effectively.

Satara Municipal Council is responsible for providing sanitation and solid waste management services in the city, through private contractors. 70 MT/day of solid waste is generated per day. 18 Mt/ day is disposed off through composting. 8.17 km^{2} of the city, covering 20972 households, are covered under door to door collection.

12.8 MLD of sewage is generated in the city. Satara Municipal Council has plans to construct an STP of 17.5 MLD capacity.

The Maharashtra Right to Public Service Act, 2015 is a revolutionary Act. Citizens can get complete information regarding which services are available under this Act by accessing either the mobile app RTS Maharashtra or ‘Aaple Sarkar’ Web Portal. Citizens can even apply online for availing these services.

== Economy ==
Sugarcane is the single biggest crop of Satara along with turmeric and ginger. The Satara district has around 302 banks. The per capita of Satara district is nearly 1.2 times the state average. The British had, during the pre-Independence period started a variety of industries in Satara for Menthol and soap manufacturing in 1905. Bigger industries for copper were started in 1922. After independence, the whole district was stagnant in industrial growth. From 1950 to 1960, industrial growth restarted and the manufacture of jaggery was started in the Satara Tehsil area. There is tanning industry in Satara city. It existed during the British rule, and after independence, the Maharashtra government established a modern tanning center in 1957.

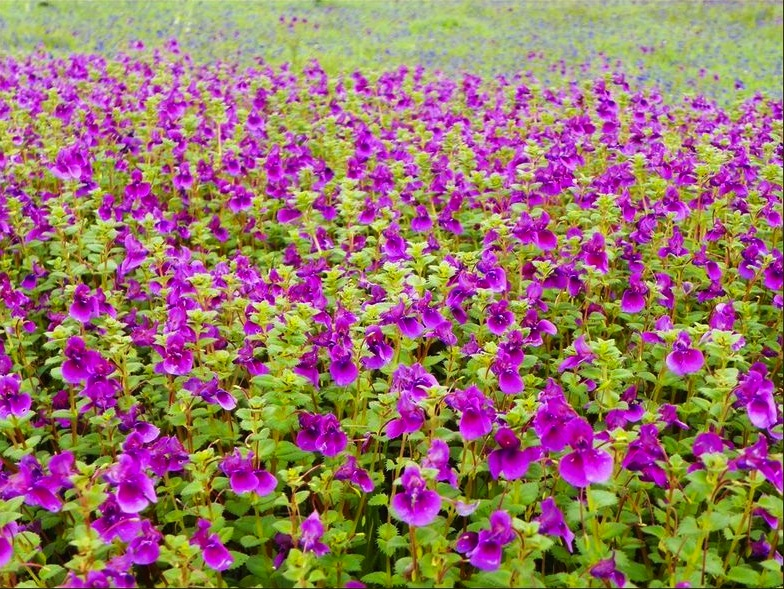
Kas plateau, Satara (World Heritage Site)

Sangam Mahuli, Satara

=== Tourism ===
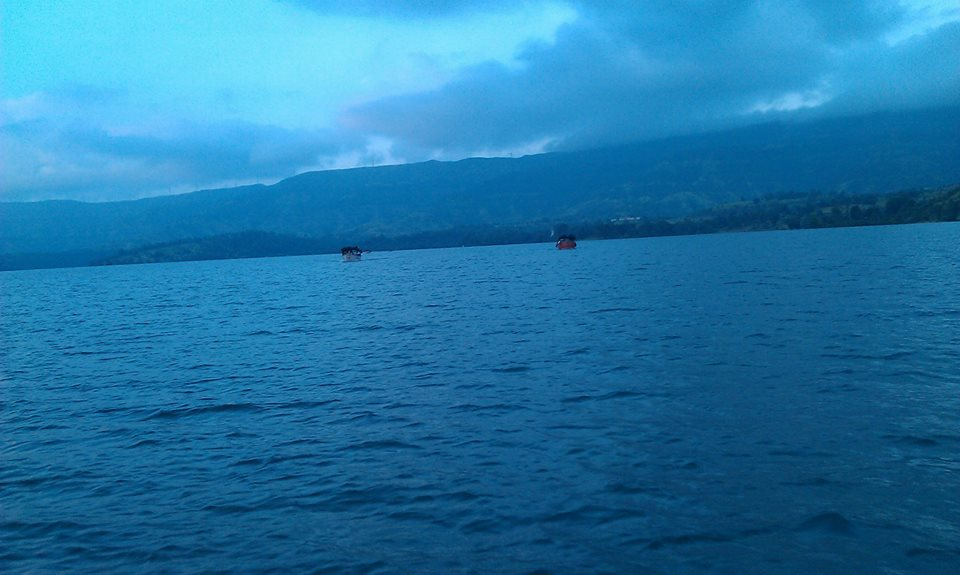
Bamnoli boating view

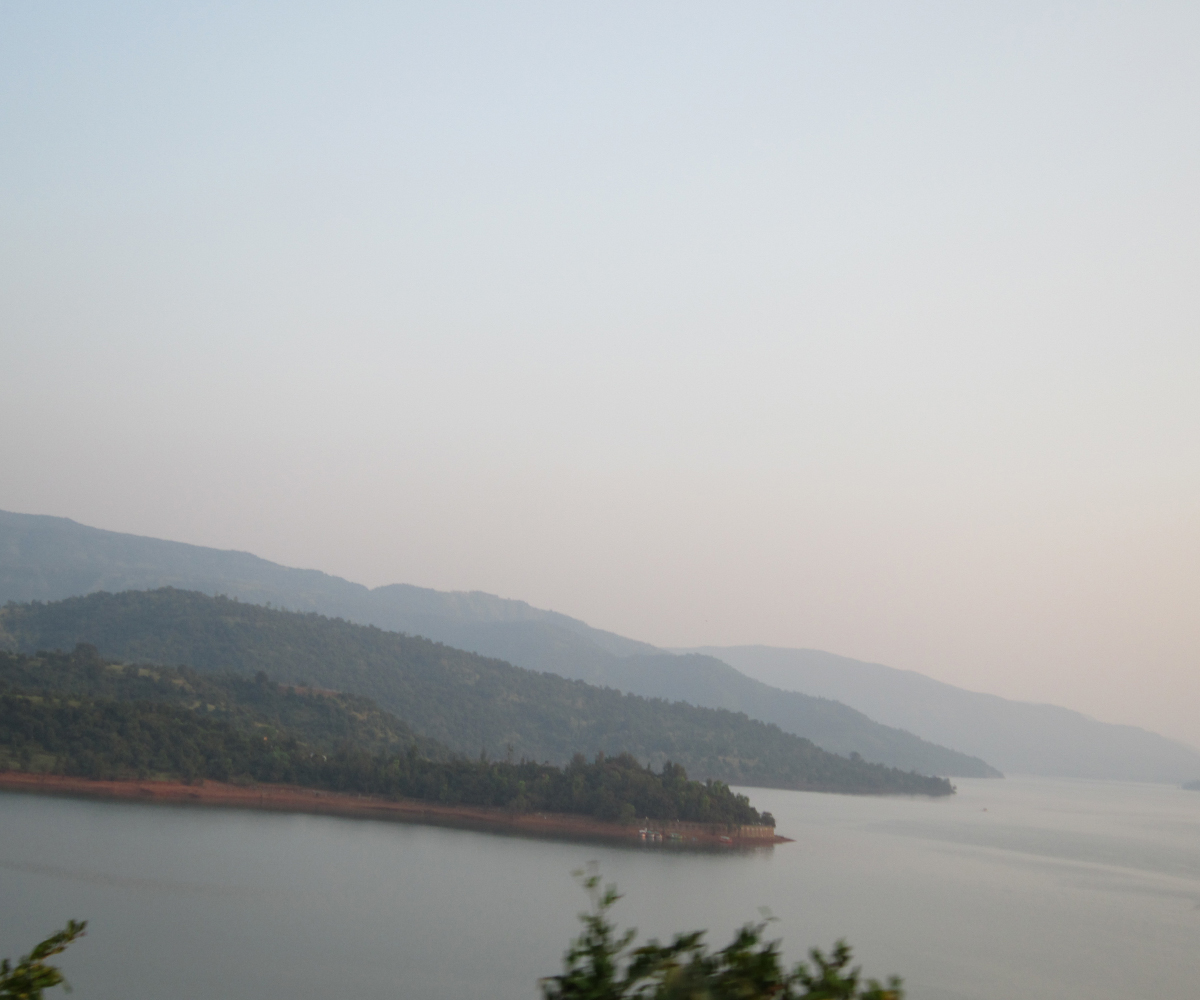
A view of Narayan Maharaj Math from Shembdi Vaghali-Bamnoli Road

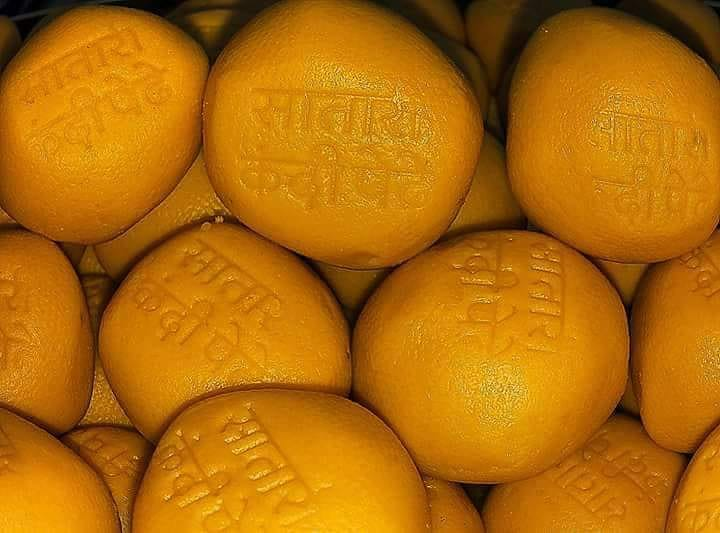

The famous tourist points near Satara city are:

- Ajinkyatara Fort (अजिंक्यतारा किल्ला)
- Jarandeshwar Hanuman - Satara Koregaon Road
- Bajirao Vihir in shukrwar peth, Satara
- Vajrai Waterfall- tallest Waterfall in India.
- Sajjangad Fort (सज्जनगड किल्ला)
- Kaas Plateau – Called "Valley of flowers of Maharashtra" which is also a World Heritage Site
- Baramotichi Vihir Step well, near Limb village which is about 16 km from Satara
- Thoseghar Waterfall
- Shree Uttar Chidambaram Natraj Temple Satara
- Yewateshwar
- Bamnoli
- Dhom Dam
- Urmodi Dam
- Raje Baksavar Peer Saaheb Dargha (Khatgun)
- Chaphal (Shree Ram Mandir, Near Umbraj)

A sunset view from Naryan Maharaj Math, Bamnoli

- Paratapgad located 75 km North West of Satara

The fort's historical significance is due to the Battle of Pratapgad, which took place here on 10 November 1659, between Chatrapti Shivaji and Bijapur Sultanate general Afzal Khan. Killing of Afzal Khan by Chatrapati Shivaji was followed by decisive Maratha victory over the Bijapur army.

- Panchgani located 50 km from Satara. Panchgani, called Paachgani (पाचगणी in Marathi), is a hill station and municipal council in Satara district.

== Culture ==
=== Places to visit ===
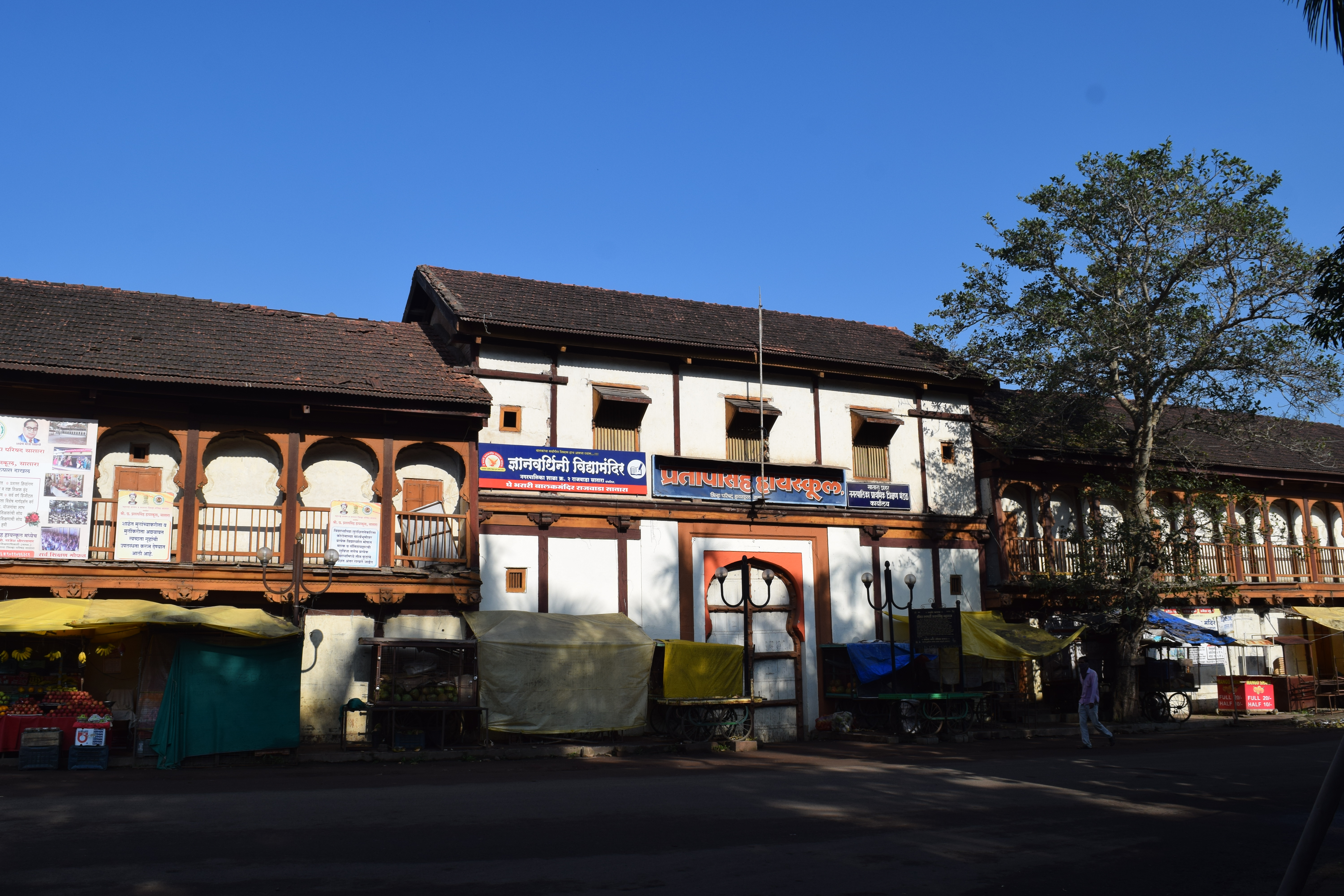
Old Rajwada

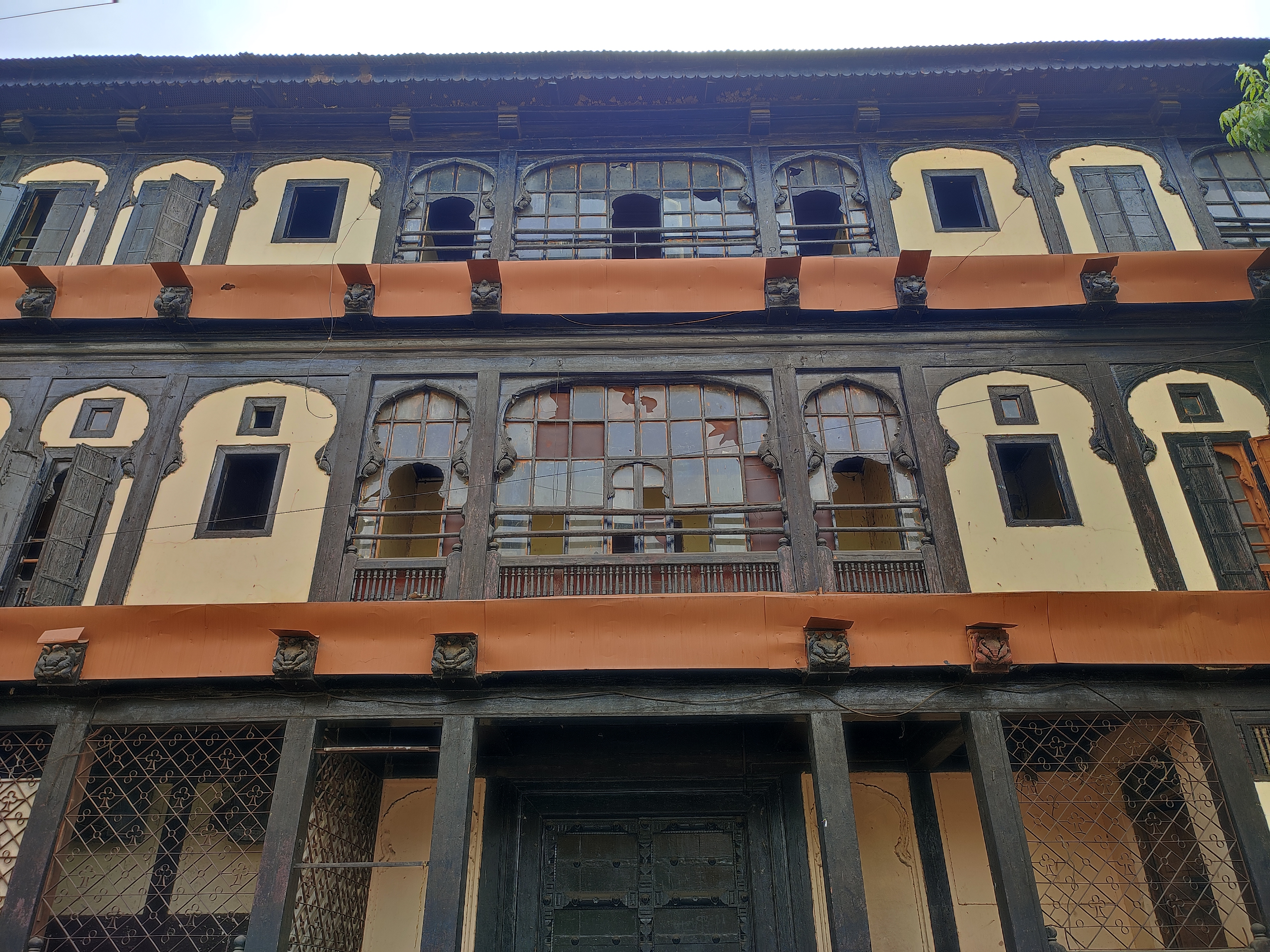
New Rajwada

Satara is located at the foot of the famous Ajinkyatara fort and on Kas plateau / Flower plateau, now a World Natural Heritage site. Satara has two palaces in the heart of the city, the Old Palace (Juna Rajwada) and the New Palace (Nava Rajwada) adjoining each other. The Old Palace was built around 300 years ago, and the New Palace was built about 200 years ago.

Satara has a unique statue of Shivaji standing near a cannon, at Powai Naka. Generally, statues of Shivaji depict him riding a horse.

Thoseghar Waterfalls, around 20 km west of Satara, is one of the best monsoon tourist places in the Western Ghats. People come from all over Maharashtra to visit the falls, especially during the monsoon season between July and October. Vajrai Waterfall, India's highest waterfall, is around 22 km from Satara. Sajjangad Fort is around 15 km from Satara.

Satara hosts the Satara Half Hill Marathon each year. In 2015, they entered the Guinness World Records book for Most People in a Mountain Run (Single Mountain) with 2,618 runners.

Apshinge Military is a small village in Satara district. At least one member of every family in the village has served or is serving in the armed forces. The British government installed a memorial in the village to recognize the 46 soldiers who died in World War I.

== Education ==
Satara is well known for Sainik School, Satara - The first among the chains of Sainik Schools established in the country on 23 June 1961 under the Ministry of Defence. Satara has base of Rayat education institutes. Yashavantrao Chavan Institute of Science is one of the famous institute from District. Rayat Shikshan Sanstha's Karmaveer Bhaurao Patil college of engineering, Satara is the oldest engineering college in Satara city. Government Medical College (GMC), Satara had its first batch graduation in the year 2022. It is located near the Civil Hospital Satara

- KSD Shanbhag Vidyalaya (1990)
- Government Medical College (2022)

== Notable people ==
- Hari Makaji Naik
- Jagannath Raoji Chitnis
- Sai Bhosale
- Yashwantrao Chavan
- Tanaji Malusare
- Rani of Jhansi
- Jyotirao Phule
- Bhaurao Patil
- Krantisinha Nana Patil
- Khashaba Dadasaheb Jadhav
- Col Santosh Mahadaik
- Narendra Dabholkar
- Shivendra Raje Bhosale
- Sayaji Shinde
- Lalita Babar
- Sharad Pawar
- Shahir Sable
- Bal Kolhatkar

== Transport ==
=== Road links ===
Satara is about 250 km from Mumbai on National Highway 48 (via Mumbai Pune Expressway and PB road) and 110 km away from Pune. A bypass on Highway 48 was constructed to avoid traffic congestion in the city. National Highway 965D connects Kedgaon, Supe, Morgaon, Nira, Lonand, Wathar up to Satara. National Highway 548C starts from Satara. Satara-Akluj-Latur Highway connects Satara to Latur. It passes through Koregaon, Pusegaon, Mhaswad, Akluj, Tembhurni and Murud. It will also be a 4 lane highway, work is going to start soon. State Highway 58 connects Satara with Mahabaleshwar and Solapur. Satara Mahad Bankot is a newly declared national highway connecting Satara to the Konkan region.

=== Bus links ===
Private and government state transport buses are available from Borivali, Dadar, Mumbai Central, and Thane to Satara.

=== Air links ===
Pune Airport is the nearest airport.

=== Railways ===
Satara railway station lies on the Pune-Miraj line of the Central Railways and is administered by the Pune Railway Division. The station is situated near Mahuli about 0.7 km from the Satara bus stand on the Satara Pandharpur road. Satara is On Route from Mumbai to Miraj, Sangli, Kolhapur, and Bangalore (some trains). Dadar Hubli Express, Koyna Express, Mahalaxmi Express, Maharashtra Express, Goa Express are daily trains that have stops at Satara.

== See also ==
- Bhosale
- Maratha
- Maratha Empire
- List of Maratha dynasties and states
- Peshwe
- Holkars
