= Jaoli =

- Tehsil
- Location in Maharashtra, India
- Coordinates: 17°47′40″N 73°49′45″E
- Country: India
- State: Maharashtra
- District: Satara

Languages
  - Official: Marathi
- Time zone: UTC+5:30 (IST)
- PIN: 415514
- Telephone code: 912378230478
- Vehicle registration: MH-11/D522
- Nearest city: Medha
- Lok Sabha constituency: Satara
- Vidhan Sabha constituency: Satara
- Climate: Cool (Köppen)

Jaoli is a tehsil, a taluka in subdivision of Satara district in the Indian state of Maharashtra.

== History ==
Jaoli is identified with the Jāvala-vāṭikā mentioned in the Pāṇḍaraṅgapallī grant of the early Rashtrakuta king Avidheya. Jāvala-vāṭikā was a subsidiary hamlet of the village of Pāṇḍaraṅgapallī, and the inscription records the two places (along with a third, Kāmyaka) over to a Bhargava Brahmin named Śambhu. The inscription described the three places as being on the bank of the Anevatī river, to the east of the Kollagiri hill. The inscription is dated to around the 5th century CE.

The area was ruled by the Morè (clan). The Morè clan claims descent from the Somavanshi king of the Kashmir Region. Some Morè also claims descent from the Mauryan Dynasty of Patna, Bihar which ruled over the Maurya Empire, located in present day India. Many Morè, claim of rulers like Chandragupta Maurya and Ashoka. In Pre-Shivaji era, Morè were feudatory of Vijaynagar empire along with other highest maratha clans like Bhoite, Kadam, Salunkhe, Shinde who were under Sultanates of Deccan. Later, around 1656 Shivaji captured Jaoli by defeating Chandrarao More. After that, many Morè joined the Maratha cavalry of Shivaji and remained active and trusted lieutenants of Maratha Empire.

After the death of Sambhaji, the Maratha Kingdom was put into disarray. On 26 December 1697, Sardar Manajirao More along with Mansingh More, Krushnajirao More, and Prataprao More helped Rajaram I reach Arni fort which was located 30 miles away. Rajaram eventually became the Chhatrapati.

== Subdivisions ==
- Waki, Jaoli

== See also ==
- Jaoli principality
- Morè (clan)
