= Shivaji's campaign of Javali =

1656 battle between the Shivaji and Mores

| Date | April/May 1656 |
| Location | Satara |
| Result | Shivaji's victory |

Belligerents
| Marathas | Jaoli State |

Commanders and leaders
| Shivaji; Kanhoji Jedhe; Raghunath Ballal | Chandra Rao Moré (executed); Krishnaji Moré (executed); Hanumantrao Moré † |

Strength
| 10,000 | Unknown |

Casualties and losses
| Unknown | Many were killed |

Shivaji's conquest of Jawali was a military engagement fought between the Maratha rebels, led by Shivaji and the Mores under the command of Chandra Rao More, in the year 1656. This battle took place near the town of Jawali, located in present-day Maharashtra, India.

Following the conflict, Shivaji conquered the Jawali from Mores and executed their patriarch.

== Background ==
Shivaji recruited the neighbouring Maratha court officials and Deshmukhs to his side to undermine the Bijapur kingdom, he also took sides in the succession dispute of the More family which held "nested" rights from the Bijapur kingdom , this intervention led to an all out war between him and the Mores.

== Siege of Jawali ==
Shivaji laid the siege to the fortress of Jawali. The conflict was bloody and brutal tactics were utilised, Shivaji also utilized treachery to get Chandrarao captured.

== Aftermath ==
According to the Jedhe Chronology Chandrarao capitulated to Javali in the month of Vaishakha of Shaka 1578 [between 15 April and 14 May 1656]. Shivaji incarcerated Chandrarao and his sons, Krishnaji and Baji. Though Chandrarao endeavoured to break free from prison, Shivaji had him and his son Krishnaji executed but Baji managed to escape. Shivaji captured Raigarh, Supa, Rohida, Tikona, Lohgarh, Rajmachi, and more.

Shivaji raised up a fort in Jawali which he named Pratapgad. Ganoji Govind was made commander of the Pratapgad fort. The capture of Jawali opened doors for Shivaji’s entry into the Konkan, the coastal regions of the Maratha country. Later Shivaji came into armed conflict with the Siddis of Danda Rajpuri.

== Legacy ==
Modern historian Dipesh Chakrabarty writes about the controversial circumstances in which Javali was obtained by Shivaji in 1656. Javali was very important to Shivaji Maharaj for the founding of his Kingdom. Upon review of the documents, prominent historian Sarkar concluded that "the acquisition of Javli was the result of deliberate murder and organized treachery on part of Shivaji". However, Chakrabarty says that this conclusion did not sit well with the Nationalist historians from Maharashtra of Sarkar's time. This was despite the fact that all the old Hindu biographers agreed that it was an act of premeditated murder. The remaining son of Chandra Rao continued his fight against Shivaji by seeking refuge with the Adil shah. Other members of the clan joined the Mughals and helped the Mughal general, Jai Singh in his campaign against Shivaji. Historian Gordon agrees with Sarkar and concludes based on historical documents that Shivaji had no legal rights to Javali hence this was an act of "conscious treachery" on his part. and Indian historian Satish Chandra also comes to the same conclusion.
