= Rajput =

Social community of South Asia

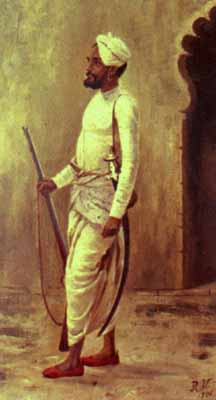
- Painting of a Rajput soldier by Raja Ravi Varma
- Religions: Majority: Hinduism; Minority: Islam • Sikhism
- Languages: Hindustani (Hindi-Urdu), Haryanvi, Bundeli, Bagheli, Chhattisgarhi, Marwari, Mewari, Shekhawati, Dhundari, Malwi, Bhojpuri, Awadhi, Braj Bhasha, Angika, Magahi, Maithili, Gujarati, Sindhi, Punjabi, Marathi, Western Pahari, Dogri, Kumaoni, Garhwali
- Country: • India • Pakistan • Nepal
- Populated states: Rajasthan • Gujarat • Madhya Pradesh • Haryana • Indian Punjab • Pakistani Punjab • Himachal Pradesh • Uttarakhand • Jammu and Kashmir • Azad Kashmir • Uttar Pradesh • Bihar • Maharashtra • Sindh
- Region: •Northern India •Western India
- Feudal title: Thakur
- Status: Forward caste (except in Karnataka)

Rājpūt (IPA: [ɾaːd͡ʒpuːt̪], from Sanskrit rājaputra meaning "son of a king"), also called Thākur (IPA: [ʈʰaːkʊɾ]), is a large multi-component cluster of castes, kin bodies, and local groups, sharing social status and ideology of genealogical descent originating from the northern part of the Indian subcontinent. However, the derivation from rājaputra is misleading because although many Rajputs belonged to some ruling clans, the majority of the Rajput community were common agricultural laborers whose main source of income was farming. The term Rajput covers various patrilineal clans historically associated with warriorhood: several clans claim Rajput status, although not all claims are universally accepted. According to modern scholars, almost all Rajput clans originated from peasant or pastoral communities.

Over time, the Rajputs emerged as a social class comprising people from a variety of ethnic and geographical backgrounds. From the 12th to 16th centuries, the membership of this class became largely hereditary, although new claims to Rajput status continued to be made in later centuries. Several Rajput-ruled kingdoms played a significant role in many regions of central and northern India from the seventh century onwards.

The Rajput population and the former Rajput states are found in northern, western, central and eastern India, as well as southern and eastern Pakistan. These areas include Rajasthan, Delhi, Haryana, Gujarat, Eastern Punjab, Western Punjab, Uttar Pradesh, West Bengal, Himachal Pradesh, Jammu, Uttarakhand, Bihar, Madhya Pradesh, Sindh and Azad Kashmir.

In terms of religious affiliation, in 1988 it was estimated that out of a total Rajput population of roughly 38 million in the Indian subcontinent, the majority, 30 million (79%) were Hindus, nearly 8 million (19.9%) were followers of Islam (mostly concentrated in Pakistan) while slightly less than 200,000 (0.5%) were Sikhs.

== Etymology and early references ==
=== Rājaputra ===
The word Rājaputra (Sanskrit: राजपुत्र; literally "son of a king") finds mention in some ancient Hindu scriptures like the Rigveda, Ramayana and Mahabharata. According to Sabita Singh, the word first appears in a sense other than its literal meaning in the 7th century Bakhshali manuscript from NWFP in reference to a mercenary soldier, while in the 8th century Chachnama of Sindh, it is used for elite horsemen. A late 11th century inscription from Mount Abu talks of "all the rājaputras of the illustrious Rājaputra clan". In Kalhana's Rājatarangiṇī (12th century), the rājaputras appear as mercenary soldiers claiming high status on account of birth. An inscription from Chittor (1301) mentions three generations of rājaputras.

B.D Chattopadhyay says that according to the references to rajputras in medieval and early medieval sources, they represent a mixed caste that constituted a large section of "petty chiefs holding estates". Thus, the Rajputra covers all levels from the actual son of a king to the lowest level landholder. The term is used for a prince under the Chahamanas but for the lowest ranking "fief" holder under the Chalukyas. According to some scholars, the term rajputra was reserved for the immediate relatives of a king; scholars like BD Chattopadhyay believe that it was used for a larger group of high-ranking men.

=== Thakur ===
According to B.D Chattopadhyay, from 700 CE, north India's political and military landscape was dominated by large Kshatriya landowners called thakurs, some of whom were descended from pastoral tribes and central Asian invaders; they later came to be known as Rajputs. Andre Wink notes that the military nobility of Sindh ruler Dahir to which the Chachnama (8th century) and Al-Baladhuri (9th century) refer as thakurs can be seen as Rajputs in the original sense of the word.

=== Rajput ===
The term rajput is derived from the Sanskrit word rājaputra. Its literal meaning is "son of a king". However, the meaning cannot be applied literally to the community because most of the Rajputs were common agricultural laborers although some were members of the ruling clans.

The term finds mention in Vidyapati's Kīrtilatā (1380) among castes inhabiting the Jaunpur city.

According to modern scholars, the word "rajput" meant 'horse soldier', 'trooper', 'headman of a village' or 'subordinate chief' before the 15th century. Individuals or groups with whom the word "rajput" was associated are generally considered varna–samkara ("mixed caste origin") and inferior to Kshatriya.

B.D Metcalf and T.R Metcalf write that under the Mughals, the term had become the mark of legitimate kshatriya rule.

== Origin and Varna ==
The origin of the Rajputs has been a much-debated topic among historians. Historian Satish Chandra states: "Modern historians are more or less agreed that the Rajputs consisted of miscellaneous groups including Shudra and tribals. Some were Brahmans who took to warfare, and some were from Tribes- indigenous or foreign". Thus, the Rajput community formation was a result of political factors that influenced caste mobility, called Sanskritization by some scholars and Rajputization by others. Modern scholars agree that nearly all Rajputs clans originated from peasant or pastoral communities.

Alf Hiltebeitel discusses three theories by Raj era and early writers for Rajput origin and gives the reasons as to why these theories are dismissed by modern research. British colonial-era writers characterised Rajputs as descendants of the foreign invaders such as the Scythians or the Hunas, and believed that the Agnikula myth was invented to conceal their foreign origin. According to this theory, the Rajputs originated when these invaders were assimilated into the Kshatriya category during the 6th or 7th century, following the collapse of the Gupta Empire. While many of these colonial writers propagated this foreign-origin theory in order to legitimise the colonial rule, the theory was also supported by some Indian scholars, such as D. R. Bhandarkar. The second theory was promulgated by C.V. Vaidya who believed in the Aryan invasion theory and that the entire 9th-10th century Indian populace was composed of only one race - the Aryans who had not yet mixed with the Shudras or Dravidians. Nationalist historians Vaidya and R.B. Singh write that the Rajputs had originated from the Vedic Aryan Kshatriyas of the epics - Ramayana and Mahabharata. Vaidya bases this theory on certain attributes - such as bravery and "physical strength" of Draupadi and Kausalya and the bravery of the Rajputs. However, Hiltebeitel says that such "affinities do not point to an unbroken continuity between an ancient epic period" in the Vedic period (3500 BCE - 3000 BCE according to Vaidya) and the "great Rajput tradition" that started in sixteenth-century Rajasthan instead "raise the question of similarities between the epics' allusions to Vedic Vratya warbands and earlier medieval low status Rajput clans". Hiltebeitel concludes that such attempts to trace Rajputs from epic and Vedic sources are "unconvincing" and cites Nancy MacLean and B.D. Chattopadhyaya to label Vaidya's historiography on Rajputs as "often hopeless". A third group of historians, which includes Jai Narayan Asopa, theorised that the Rajputs were Brahmins who became rulers. However, such "one track arguments" and "contrived evidence" such as shape of the head, cultural stereotypes, etc. are dismissed by Hiltebeitel who refers to such claims and Asopa's epic references as "far-fetched" or "unintelligible".

Recent research suggests that the Rajputs came from a variety of ethnic and geographical backgrounds and various varnas. According to Norman Ziegler, the groups and individuals that rose to power in North India after Muslim invasions were no longer considered Kshatriyas although they performed similar functions; the fact that they had emerged from the lower rungs of the caste system are documented in the Rajput chronicles themselves.

André Wink states that some Rajputs may be Jats by origin. Tanuja Kothiyal states: "In the colonial ethnographic accounts rather than referring to Rajputs as having emerged from other communities, Bhils, Mers, Minas, Gujars, Jats, Raikas, all lay a claim to a Rajput past from where they claim to have 'fallen'. Historical processes, however, suggest just the opposite". She points to the fact that "both Rajputs and Jats appear to originate from the mobile cattle rearing and rustling groups", hence it is understandable that they refer to each other in their chronicles, although they try to remain distinct. However, since Rajputs dominated the region, they were portrayed as "warriors" as opposed to Jats who were portrayed as "farmers", thus wiping out "Jat kingship" from the historiography. Christopher Bayly writes that the ruling dynasties among the Rajputs, Jats and Maratha, that arose when the Islamic cultural influence diminished, mostly originated from peasant of nomadic castes, but they performed rituals such as Śrāddha by employing high status Brahmins. These communities hoped that such rituals would enable them to make a Kshatriya claim.

According to scholars, in medieval times "the political units of India were probably ruled most often by men of very low birth" and this "may be equally applicable for many clans of 'Rajputs' in northern India". Burton Stein explains that this process of allowing rulers, frequently of low social origin, a "clean" rank via social mobility in the Hindu Varna system serves as one of the explanations of the longevity of the unique Indian civilisation.

Historian Janet Tiwary Kamphorst mentions the medieval tales on Pabuji depicting Rajput, Charan, Bhil and Rabari warriors fighting side by side as well as other medieval and contemporary texts show claims made by Nomadic tribes of the Thar desert to a higher rank in the society. Thus, she says that it is said that "formerly all Rajputs were once Maldhari (cattle-keepers) or vice-versa, it is asserted that all nomadic peoples have Rajput ansa (essence) in their veins".

Gradually, the term Rajput came to denote a social class, which was formed when the various tribal and nomadic groups became landed aristocrats, and transformed into the ruling class. These groups assumed the title "Rajput" as part of their claim to higher social positions and ranks. The early medieval literature suggests that this newly formed Rajput class comprised people from multiple castes. Thus, the Rajput identity is not the result of a shared ancestry. Rather, it emerged when different social groups of medieval India sought to legitimise their newly acquired political power by claiming Kshatriya status. These groups started identifying as Rajput at different times, in different ways. Thus, modern scholars summarise that Rajputs were a "group of open status" since the eighth century, mostly illiterate warriors who claimed to be reincarnates of ancient Indian Kshatriyas – a claim that had no historical basis. Moreover, this unfounded Kshatriya status claim showed a sharp contrast to the classical varna of Kshatriyas as depicted in Hindu literature in which Kshatriyas are depicted as an educated and urbanite clan. Historian Thomas R. Metcalf mentions the opinion of Indian scholar K. M. Panikkar who also considers the famous Rajput dynasties of medieval India to have come from non-Kshatriya castes.

Historian Kapur writes that "divergent social groups got incorporated in the new socio-political fold of rajputras including Shudras. That's why the Brihaddharma Purana regarded rajputras as a mixed caste and Shudra-kamalakara equates the Rajputs with ugra, a mixed caste born of the union of a Kshatriya man and a Shudra woman" In Sudrakamalakara (17th century), the Sanskrit term rajapūta has been compared with ugra - "a mixed caste born out of the union of a Kshatriya man and a Shudra woman. This makes rajapūta a "sankarajāti" (mixed group) ie equivalent to shudras. Ananya Vajpeyi argues that rajapūta has a different meaning from Rājpūt in realpolitik. With an unhistorical meaning, even if the dharmashastras attempt to fix the place of a jati like 'rajapūta' close to shudra, the socio-historical type 'Rājpūt' always gravitates to the Kshatriya varna, which makes the lexical similarity between the two words semantically misleading.

In past, the Rajputs made fanatical attempts to assert their Kshatriya status which differentiate them from other communities. Dipankar Gupta says that the reason that originally low castes, such as Rajput, who had a shudra status in the early medieval era, have been enabled to claim Kshatriya status in modern times is due to political power. He also says that Rajputs, Jats, Marathas - all claim Kshatriya status but do not accept each other's claim. There is no agreement on who is a true kshatriya caste.

Stewart Gordon writes that during the era of the Mughal empire, hypergamous marriage "marrying up", combined with service in the state army was another way a tribal family could "become" Rajput. This process required a change in dress, diet, worship, and other traditions, ending widow remarriage, for example. Such a marriage between someone from a tribal family, and a member of an acknowledged - but possibly poor - Rajput family, would ultimately enable the non-Rajput family to transform themselves to Rajput. This marriage pattern supports the fact that Rajput was an "open caste category", available to those who served the Mughals. Badri Narayan has written in his paper on mobility of the Dalit castes, that some Pasis that married their daughters to Rajput men, were able to become part of the Rajput community themselves.

Rajput formation continued in the colonial era. Even in the 19th century, anyone from the "village landlord" to the "newly wealthy lower caste Shudra" could employ Brahmins to retrospectively fabricate a genealogy and within a couple of generations they would gain acceptance as Hindu Rajputs. This process would get mirrored by communities in north India. This process of origin of the Rajput community resulted in hypergamy as well as female infanticide that was common in Hindu Rajput clans. Scholars refer to this as "Rajputisation", which, like Sanskritisation, was a mode for upward mobility, but it differed from Sanskritisation in other attributes, like the method of worship, lifestyle, diet, social interaction, rules for women, and marriage, etc. German historian Hermann Kulke has coined the term "Secondary Rajputisation" for describing the process of members of a tribe trying to re-associate themselves with the former chief of their tribe who had already transformed himself into a Rajput via Rajputisation and thus become Rajputs themselves.

== Emergence as a community ==
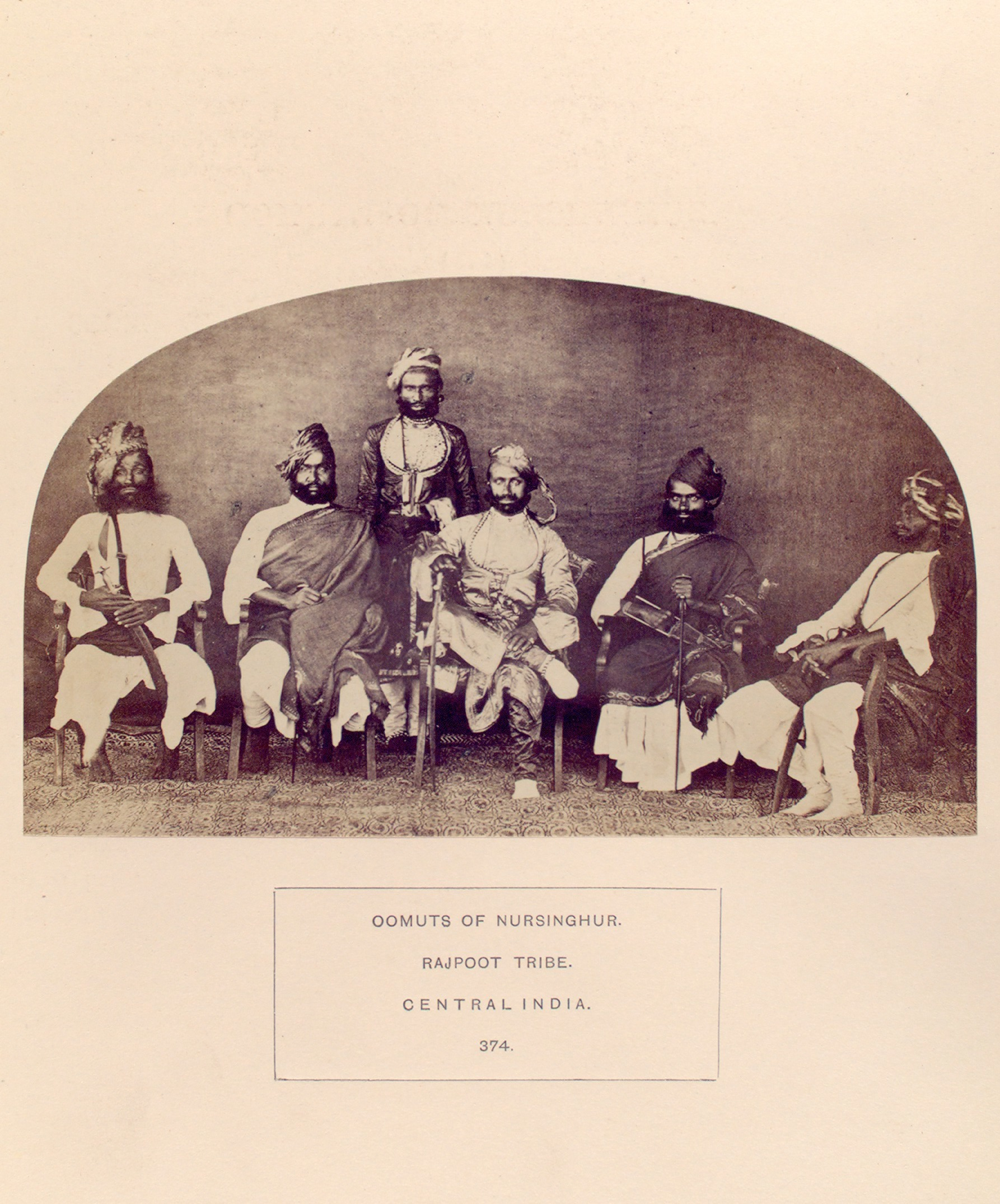
Rajputs of Central India

There are historical indications of the group calling themselves Rajputs settling in Indo-Gangetic Plain by the 6th century. However, scholarly opinions differ on when the term Rajput acquired hereditary connotations and came to denote a clan-based community.

An opinion asserts that the terms like rajputra and rāuta began to be more commonly used from 12th century onwards to denote a large number of people and a Rājaputra/Rajput caste established itself well before the thirteenth century. The reference to the clan structure of Rajputs in contemporary historical works like Rajatarangini by Kalhana along with other epigraphic evidences indicates their existence as a community by 12th century.

While Rajatarangini puts the number of Rajput clans at 36, the Varna Ratnakara (1324) features a list of 72 Rajput clans including Chouhāna, Pamāra, Chandella, Kachchvāha, Guhilot, Gāndhavariyā, Baisvara, Bhaṭi etc.

Historian Brajadulal Chattopadhyaya, based on his analysis of inscriptions (primarily from Rajasthan), believed that by the 12th century, the term rajaputra was associated with fortified settlements, kin-based landholding, and other features that later became indicative of the Rajput status. According to him, the title acquired "an element of heredity" from c. 1300. A study of 11th–14th century inscriptions from western and central India, by Michael B. Bednar, concludes that the designations such as rajaputra, thakkura and rauta were not necessarily hereditary during this period.

Rajputs were involved in nomadic pastoralism, animal husbandry and cattle trade until much later than popularly believed. The 17th century chronicles of Muhnot Nainsi i.e. Munhata Nainsi ri Khyat and Marwar ra Paraganan ri Vigat discuss disputes between Rajputs pertaining to cattle raids. In addition, Folk deities of the Rajputs – Pabuji, Mallinath, Gogaji and Ramdeo were considered protectors of cattle herding communities. They also imply struggle among Rajputs for domination over cattle and pasturelands. The emergence of Rajput community was the result of a gradual change from mobile pastoral and tribal groups into landed sedentary ones. This necessitated control over mobile resources for agrarian expansion which in turn necessitated kinship structures, martial and marital alliances.

B.D Chattopadhyaya opines that during its formative stages, the Rajput class was quite assimilative and absorbed people from a wide range of lineages. However, by the late 16th century, it had become genealogically rigid, based on the ideas of blood purity, Dirk Kolff writes. The membership of the Rajput class was now largely inherited rather than acquired through military achievements. A major factor behind this development was the consolidation of the Mughal Empire, whose rulers had great interest in genealogy. As the various Rajput chiefs became Mughal feudatories, they no longer engaged in major conflicts with each other. This decreased the possibility of achieving prestige through military action, and made hereditary prestige more important.

According to David Ludden, the word "Rajput" acquired its present-day meaning in the 16th century. According to Kolff, during 16th and 17th centuries, the Rajput rulers and their bards (charans) sought to legitimise the Rajput socio-political status on the basis of descent and kinship. They fabricated genealogies linking the Rajput families to the ancient dynasties, and associated them with myths of origins that established their Kshatriya status. This led to the emergence of what Indologist Dirk Kolff calls the "Rajput Great Tradition", which accepted only hereditary claims to the Rajput identity, and fostered a notion of eliteness and exclusivity. The legendary epic poem Prithviraj Raso, which depicts warriors from several different Rajput clans as associates of Prithviraj Chauhan, fostered a sense of unity among these clans. The text thus contributed to the consolidation of the Rajput identity by offering these clans a shared history.

By 1765, Awadh had become ally of the British East India Company and the increase in demand for revenue led to a continuous tussle in between the Nawab of Awadh and Rajput leadership bringing political instability in the region.

In one 18th-century example given by Pinch, Rajputs of Awadh countered the upward mobility of some of the peasant castes, who by virtue of their economic prosperity sought higher status by wearing Janeu, a sacred thread or claimed Kshatriya status. The records indicates that during the tenure of Asaf-ud-Daula in Awadh, when a section of Awadhiya Kurmi were about to be bestowed with the title of Raja, the Rajput constituency of Asaf's court caused stiff opposition to the move despite the fact that the Rajputs themselves were newcomers to the court and were peasant-soldiers a few year before. Rajputs of Awadh along with Brahmins also formed the major groups who gained during Asaf's regime.

Despite these developments, migrant soldiers made new claims to the Rajput status until as late as the 19th century. In the 19th century, the colonial administrators of India re-imagined the Rajputs as similar to the Anglo-Saxon knights. They compiled the Rajput genealogies in the process of settling land disputes, surveying castes and tribes, and writing history. These genealogies became the basis of distinguishing between the "genuine" and the "spurious" Rajput clans.

== History ==
=== History of Rajput Kingdoms ===
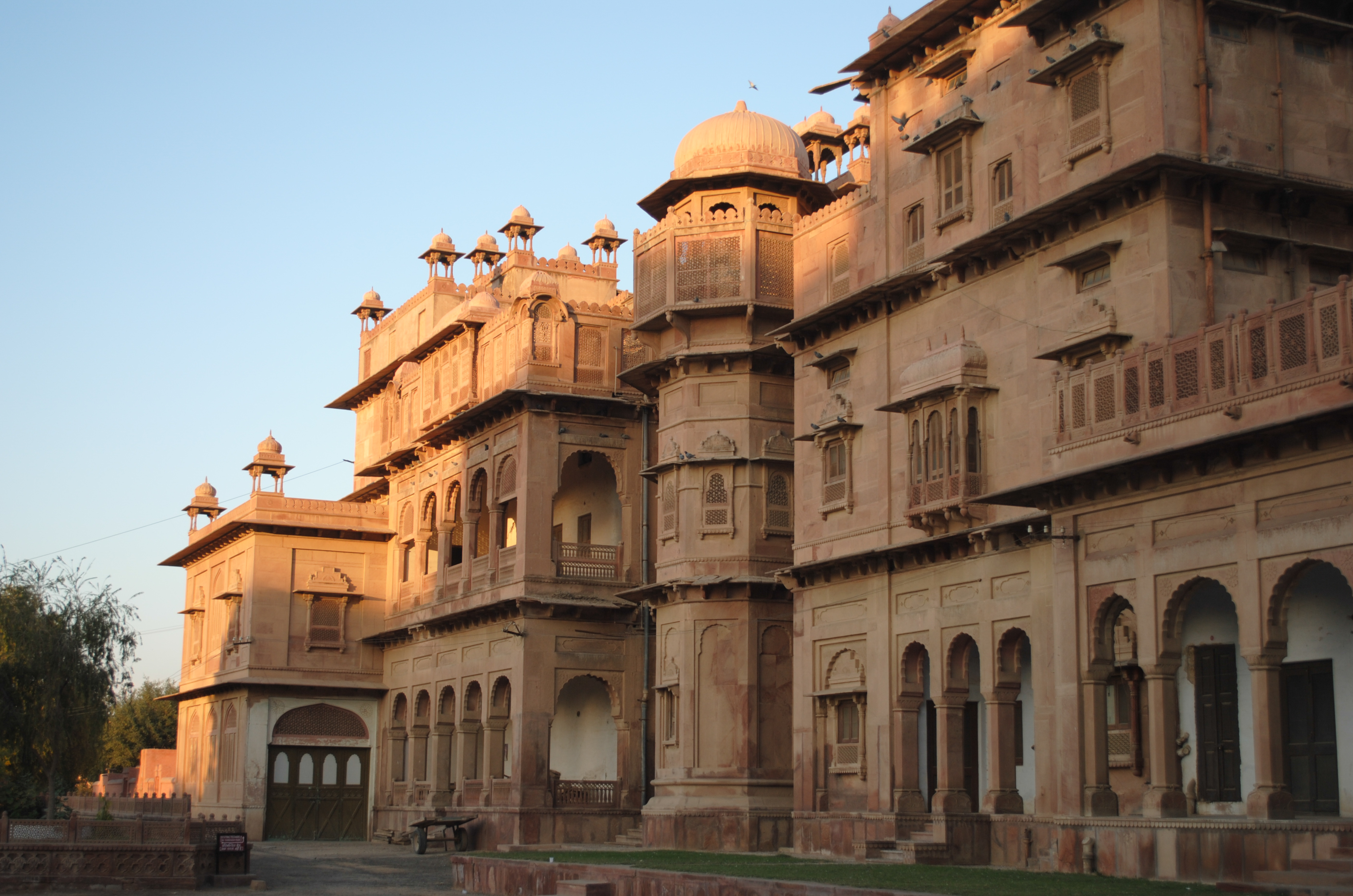
During their centuries-long rule, the Rajputs constructed several palaces. Shown here is the Junagarh Fort in Bikaner, Rajasthan, which was built by the Rathore Rajput rulers (see Rajput architecture).

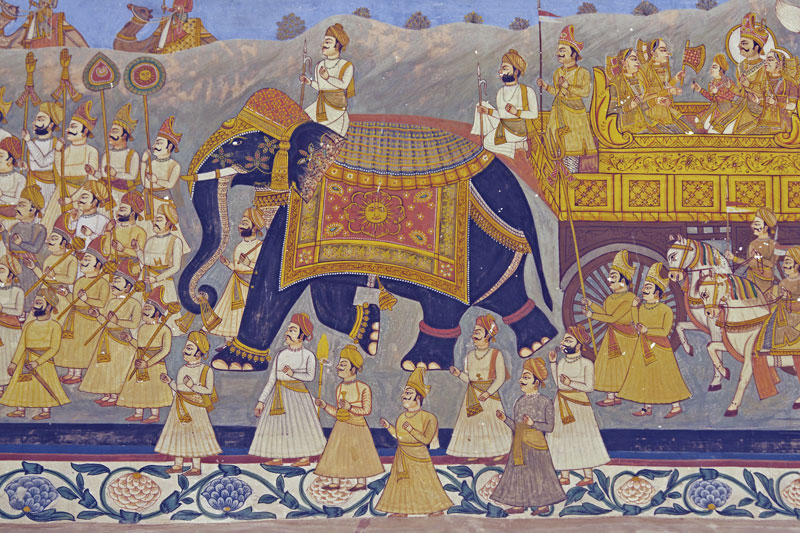
A royal Rajput procession, depicted on a mural at the Mehrangarh Fort in Jodhpur (see Rajput painting)

Scholars stage emergence of Rajput clans as early as seventh century AD. when they start to make themselves lords of various localities and dominate region in current day Northern India. These dynasties were the Gurjara-Pratiharas, Chahamanas (of Shakambhari, Nadol and Jalor), the Tomaras of Delhi, the Chaulukyas, the Paramaras, the Gahadavalas, Chandela, Sisodias, Guhilas etc. However, term "Rajput" has been used as an anachronistic designation for leading martial lineages of 11th and 12th centuries that confronted the Ghaznavid and Ghurid invaders, although the Rajput identity for a lineage did not exist at this time, these lineages were classified as aristocratic Rajput clans in the later times.

The Rajput ruled kingdoms repelled early invasions of Arab commanders after Muhammad ibn Qasim conquered Sindh and executed last Hindu king of the kingdom, Raja Dahir. Rajput family of Mewar under Bappa Rawal and later under Khoman fought off invasions by Arab generals and restricted them only until the border of Rajasthan but failed to recapture Sindh. By the first quarter of 11th century, Turkic conqueror Mahmud Ghaznavi launched several successful military expeditions in the territories of Rajputs, defeating them every time and by 1025 A.D, he demolished and looted the famous Somnath Temple and its Rajput ruler Bhimdev Solanki fled his capital. Rajput rulers at Gwalior and Kalinjar were able to hold off assaults by Maḥmūd, although the two cities did pay him heavy tribute. By last quarter of 12th century, Muhammad of Ghor expelled the Ghaznawids from their last bastion in Lahore in 1186, thereby securing the strategic route of Khyber Pass. After capturing the northwest frontier, he invaded Rajput domain. In 1191, Prithviraj Chauhan of Ajmer led a coalition of Rajput kings and defeated Ghori near Taraori. However, he returned a year later with an army of mounted archers and crushed Rajput forces on the same battlefield of Taraori, Prithviraj fled the battlefield but was caught near Sirsa and was executed by Ghurids. Following the battle, the Delhi Sultanate became prominent in the Delhi region.

The Rajputs fought against Sultans of Delhi from Rajasthan and other adjoining areas. By first quarter of 14th century, Alauddin Khalji sacked key Rajput fortresses of Chittor (1303), Ranthambor (1301) and other Rajput ruled kingdoms like Siwana and Jalore. However, Rajputs resurgence took place under Rana Hammir who defeated Tughlaq army of Muhammad bin Tughluq in Singoli in 1336 CE and recaptured Rajasthan from Delhi sultanate. In the 15th century, the Muslim sultans of Malwa and Gujarat put a joint effort to overcome the Mewar ruler Rana Kumbha but both the sultans were defeated. Kumbha's grandson renowned Rana Sanga inherited a troubling kingdom after death of his brothers but through his capable rule turned traditional kingdom of Mewar into one of the greatest power in northern India during the early 16th century. Sanga defeated Sultans of Gujarat, Malwa and Delhi several times in various battles and expanded his kingdom. Sanga led a grand alliance of Rajput rulers and defeated the Mughal forces of Babur in early combat but was defeated at Khanwa through Mughal's use of Gunpowder which was unknown in Northern India at the time. His fierce rival Babur in his autobiography acknowledged him as the greatest Hindu king of that time along with Krishnadevaraya. After a few years Maldev Rathore of Marwar rose in power controlling almost whole portion of western and eastern Rajasthan.

From 1200 CE, many Rajput groups moved eastwards towards the Eastern Gangetic plains forming their own chieftaincies. These minor Rajput kingdoms were dotted all over the Gangetic plains in modern-day Uttar Pradesh and Bihar. During this process, petty clashes occurred with the local population and in some cases, alliances were formed. Among these Rajput chieftaincies were the Bhojpur zamindars and the taluks of Awadh.

The immigration of Rajput clan chiefs into these parts of the Gangetic plains also contributed the agricultural appropriation of previously forested areas, especially in South Bihar. Some have linked this eastwards expansion with the onset of Ghurid invasion in the West.

From as early as the 16th century, Purbiya Rajput soldiers from the eastern regions of Bihar and Awadh, were recruited as mercenaries for Rajputs in the west, particularly in the Malwa region.

The Rajput kingdoms were disparate: loyalty to a clan was more important than allegiance to the wider Rajput social grouping, meaning that one clan would fight another. This and the internecine jostling for position that took place when a clan leader (raja) died meant that Rajput politics were fluid and prevented the formation of a coherent Rajput empire.

=== Mughal period ===
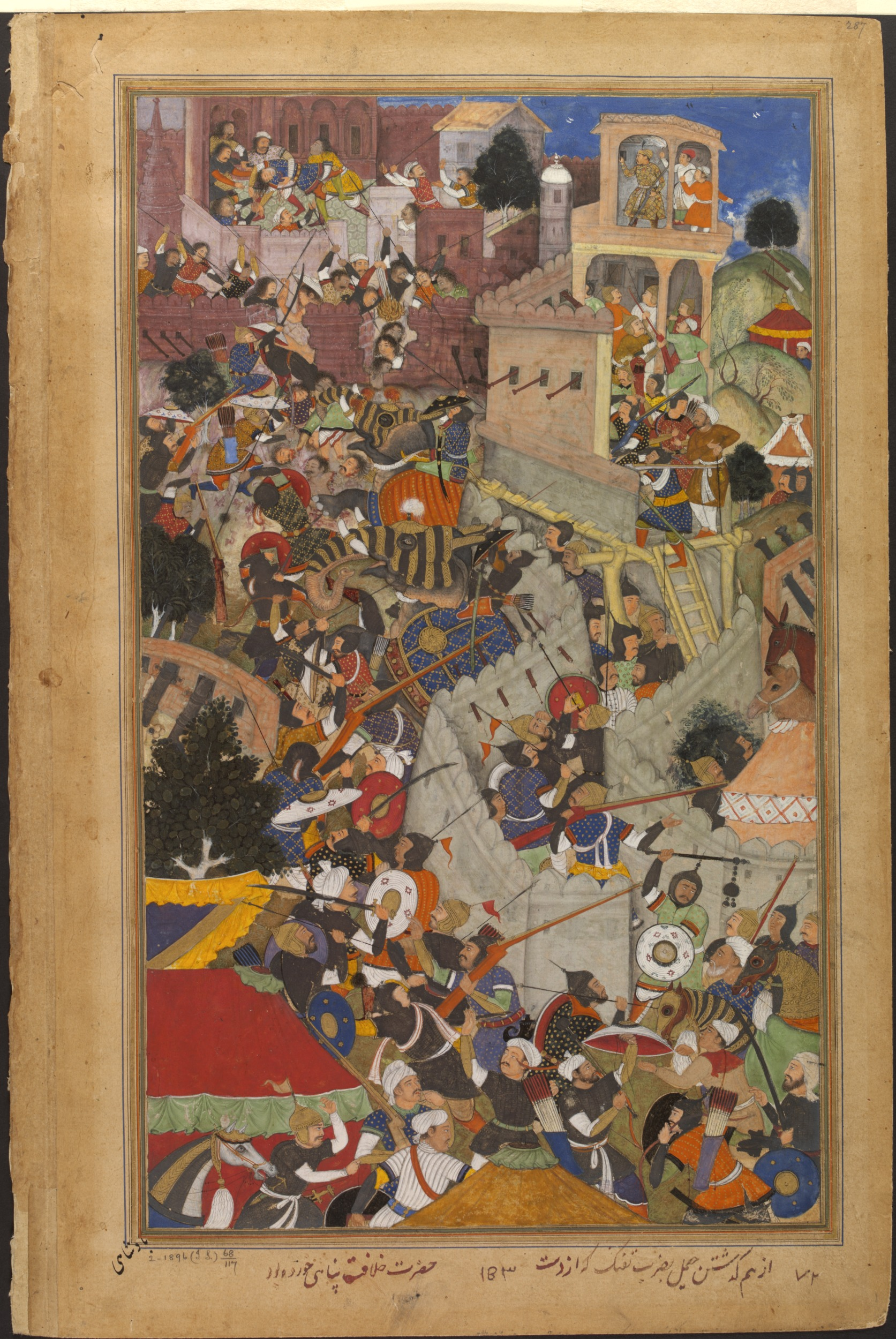
The 1567–1568 Siege of Chittorgarh led by Mughal Emperor Akbar during the Mughal–Rajput wars.

Rajputs played an important role in the Mughal history. From Akbar's rule, Rajput leaders were integrated into the Mughal ruling elite through court appointments and matrimonial alliances. Mughal emperors like Jahangir and Shah Jahan were born from Rajput mothers. Due to the presence of princes born to Rajput mothers in the Mughal harem as well as Rajput officers serving in the Mughal army, the Rajput values got diffused into the Mughal imperial system.

==== Babur's period ====
The defeat of a Rajput coalition by Babur in the Battle of Khanwa is considered a turning point in the history of North India.

==== Humayun's period ====
Rajput ruler Rana Prasad of Amarkot gave refuge to Humayun and his pregnant wife when they were fleeing from India, and, it was in his fortress that young Akbar was born. After returning to India, Humayun tried to make good relations with zamindars, both Hindu as well as Muslim. His attempts to foster positive connections with the Rajputs are viewed as a strategy aimed at engaging the local ruling classes of the country.

==== Akbar's period ====
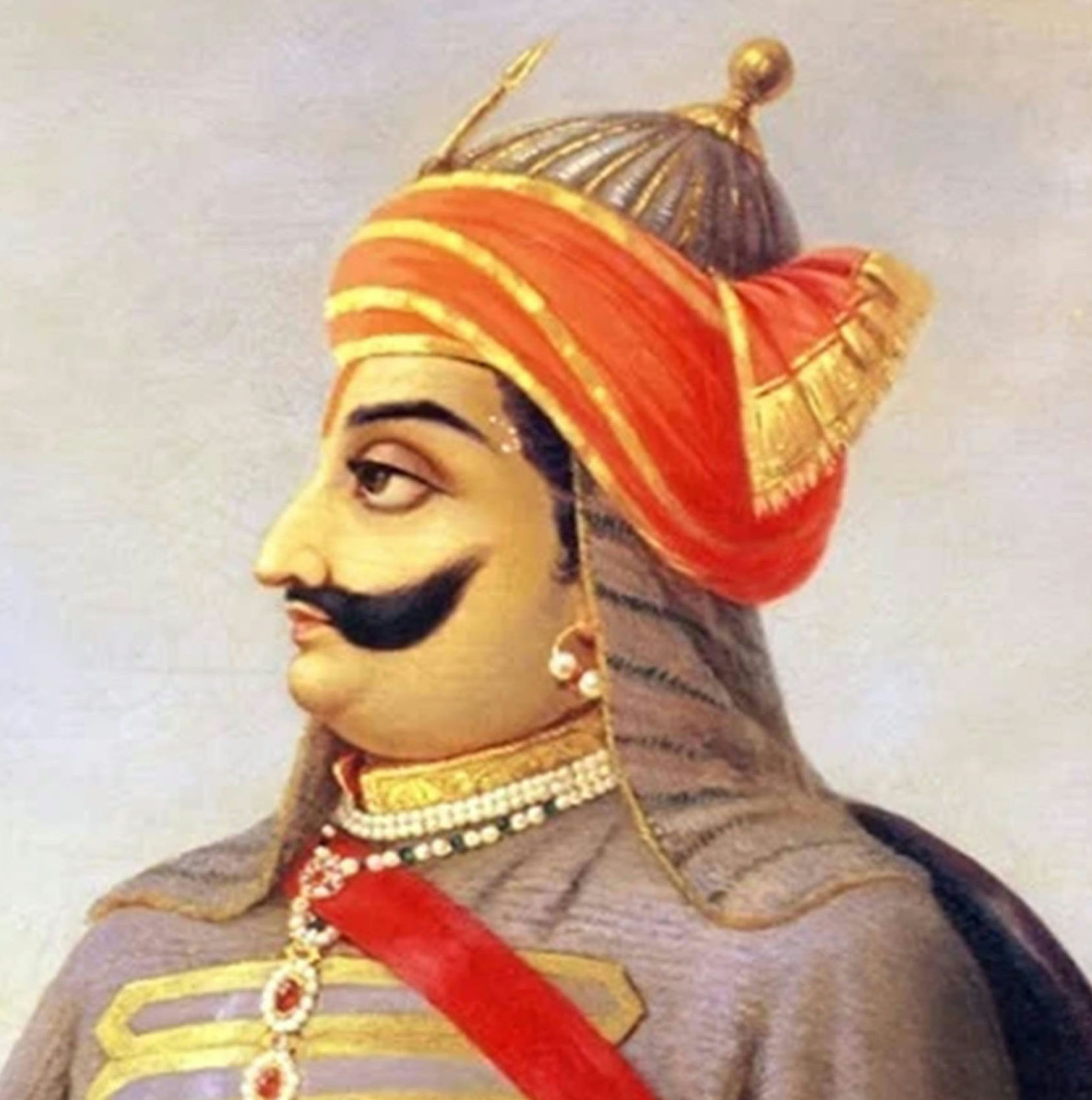
Rana Pratap, the Rana of Mewar, was popularly known for his role in battles against the Mughal Empire

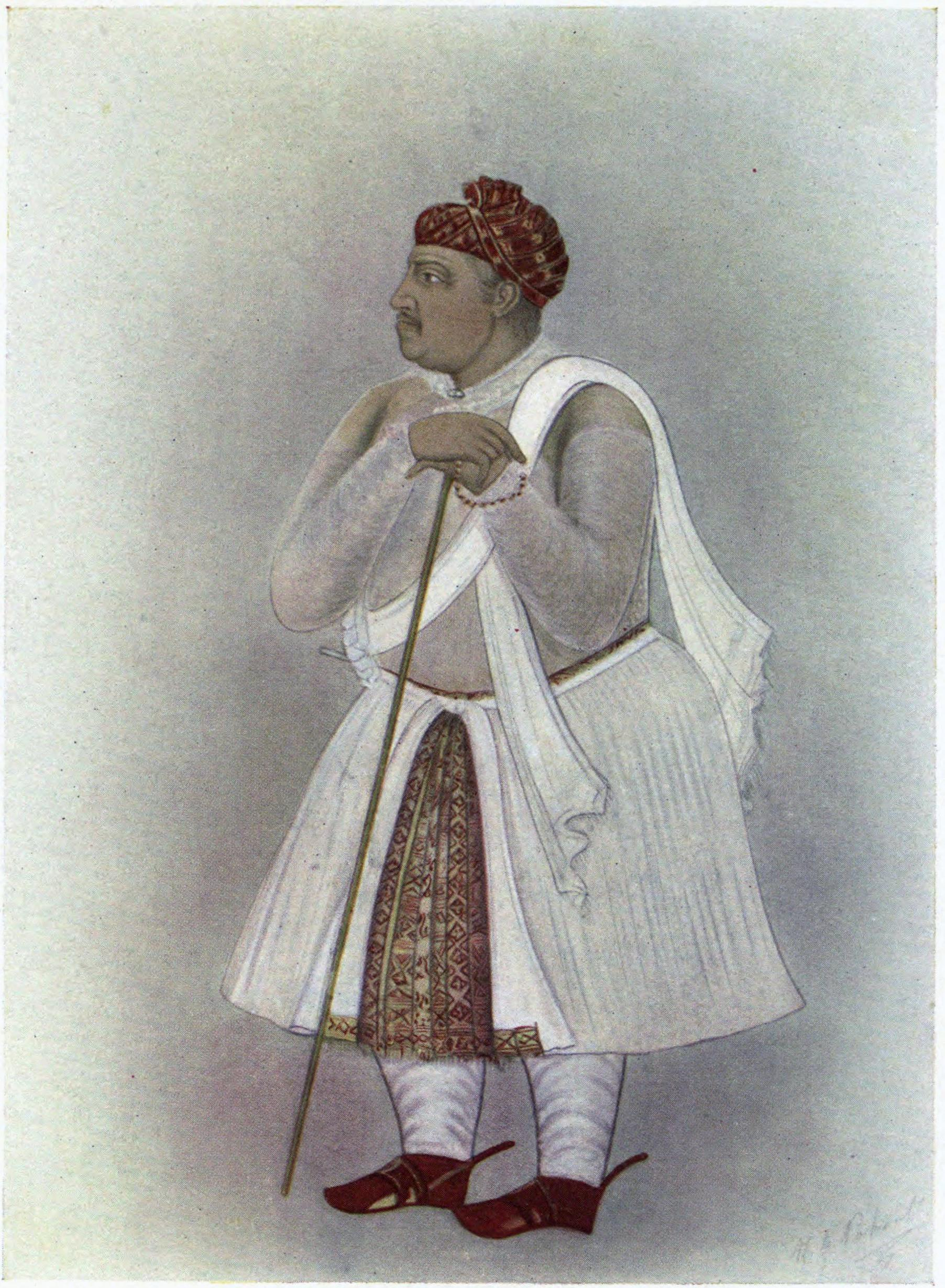
Man Singh I, an important Rajput official of Akbar.

After the mid-16th century, many Rajput rulers formed close relationships with the Mughal emperors and served them in different capacities. It was due to the support of the Rajputs that Akbar was able to lay the foundations of the Mughal empire in India. Some Rajput nobles gave away their daughters in marriage to Mughal emperors and princes for political motives. For example, Akbar accomplished 40 marriages for himself, his sons and grandsons, out of which 17 were Rajput-Mughal alliances. Akbar's successors as Mughal emperors, his son Jahangir and grandson Shah Jahan had Rajput mothers. Although Rajput rulers provided the brides to the Mughals, neither Akbar nor his successors provided brides to the Rajput rulers. For example, Akbar got his sisters and daughters married to Timurids and prominent Muslims from central and west Asia. Historian Michael Fisher states that the bards and poets patronized by the Rajput rulers who served Akbar raised Akbar to a "semi-divine" status and gives an example of Akbar being projected as a "divine master" in the "Hindu cosmic order". The writer also finds correlation between the increasing numbers of Hindu Rajput wives in Akbar's household and Hindu Rajputs as well as non-Rajput Hindus in his administration to the religious and political policy followed by him towards non-Muslims which included ending the prohibition on the construction of new temples of non -Muslim faiths like Hindu, Jain etc. In 1564 AD, Akbar had also stopped collection of jaziya from non-Muslims, a tax considered as discriminatory by several non-Muslims which also consisted of his Hindu Rajput officials. The ruling Sisodia Rajput family of Mewar made it a point of honour not to engage in matrimonial relationships with Mughals and thus claimed to stand apart from those Rajput clans who did so. Rana Pratap is renowned as a "Rajput icon" for firmly fighting with Akbar's forces for the cause of Mewar's freedom. Once Mewar had submitted and alliance of Rajputs reached a measure of stability, matrimonial between leading Rajput states and Mughals became rare.

==== Shah Jahan's period ====
Under Shah Jahan, the Bundela Rajputs were embroiled in internal strife and imperial intervention. Jhujhar Singh, son of the Bundela leader Vir Singh Deo, rebelled in 1627-28 and again in 1635. Shah Jahan skilfully exploited the divisions within the Bundela clan by deploying loyal Bundela chiefs such as Bhagwan Das, Bharat Shah, and Pahar Singh to suppress the rebellion. Although the first uprising concluded with a pardon, the second prompted a response led by Aurangzeb with support from Bundela nobles like Debi Singh, who was rewarded with the title of Raja of Orchha. However, Champat Rai Bundela, a staunch supporter of Jhujhar Singh's surviving son, Prithviraj, opposed Debi Singh's appointment. The resulting unrest undermined Debi Singh's authority, leading to his removal in 1637. Shah Jahan then placed Orchha under direct Mughal administration before appointing Pahar Singh, descendant of Vir Singh Deo, as ruler in 1642, a move which helped diminish Champat Rai's local support. Throughout Shah Jahan's reign, the Mughal court repeatedly capitalised on Bundela feuds to assert control over Bundelkhand, the Bundela Rajputs' ancestral land.

==== Aurangzeb's period ====
Aurangzeb had banned all Hindus from carrying weapons and riding horses but exempted the Rajputs. Akbar's diplomatic policy regarding the Rajputs was later damaged by the intolerant rules introduced by his great-grandson Aurangzeb. A prominent example of these rules included the re-imposition of Jaziya, which had been abolished by Akbar. However, despite imposition of Jaziya Aurangzeb's army had a high proportion of Rajput officers in the upper ranks of the imperial army and they were all exempted from paying Jaziya. The Rajputs then revolted against the Mughal empire. Aurangzeb's conflicts with them, which commenced in the early 1680s, henceforth became a contributing factor towards the downfall of the Mughal empire.

==== Under Maratha influence ====
Historian Lynn Zastoupil states that the Mughal Emperors had manipulated the appointment of the successor of the Rajput rulers earlier. However, in the early 18th century, when the Mughal power declined, Rajput states enjoyed a brief period of independence. But soon the Maratha Empire started collecting tribute from and harassing some Rajput states. The internal governance and political structures of the various Rajput kingdoms were weakened as a result of Maratha interference in dynastic succession disputes. Some Rajput states, in 1800s, appealed to the British East India Company for assistance against the Marathas but their requests for assistance were denied at the time.

=== British colonial period ===
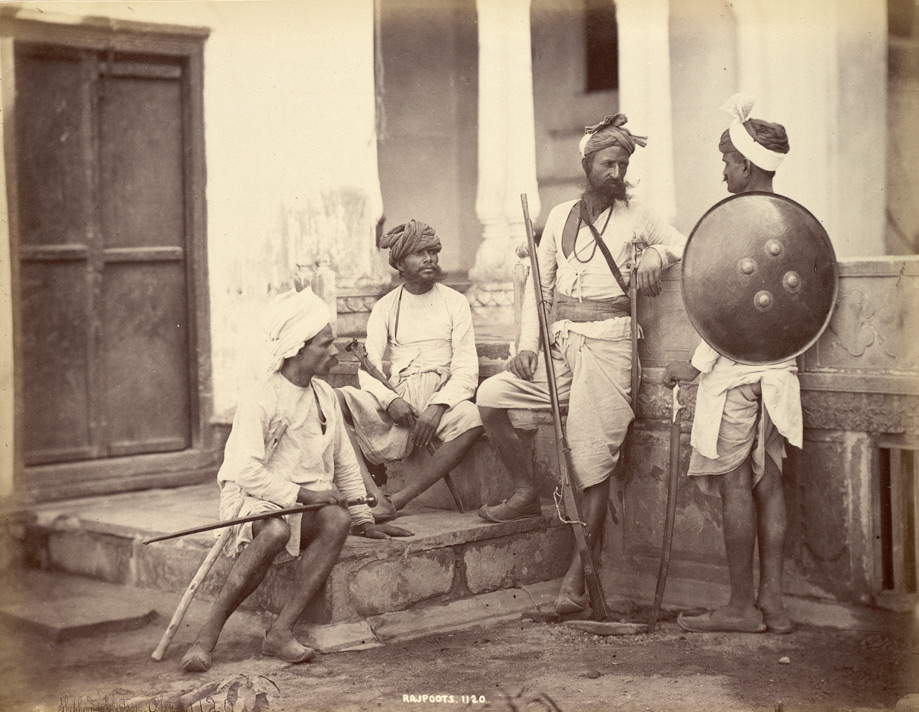
Chauhan Rajputs, Delhi (1868)

In the late eighteenth century, despite the request from two Rajput rulers for British support, the British East India company initially refused to support the Rajput states in Rajputana region as they had the policy of non-interference and considered the Rajput states to be weak. In the early nineteenth century, British administrator Warren Hastings realised how alliance with the Rajputs had benefited the Mughals and believed that a similar alliance may give the East India company political advantage in India. In his journal, in January 1815, he noted that Rajput states - Jaipur, Jodhpur and Udaipur had been "devastated" by the Scindia, Holkars, Pindari, Ameer Khan and Muhammad Shah Khan and that the Rajput rulers made multiple petitions to him requesting British protection. Moreover, the Rajput rulers had argued that "British had replaced the Mughal Empire as the supreme power of India and therefore had the responsibility to protect weaker states from aggressive ones". Charles Metcalfe agreed with this reasoning. One by one, many Rajput states in Rajputana came under British protection and became their allies - Kota, Udaipur, Bundi, Kishangarh, Bikaner, Jaipur, Pratapgarh, Banswara, Dungarpur, Jaisalmer by 1817-18 and Sirohi by 1823. The British promised to protect the Rajput states from their adversaries and not interfere in internal affairs in exchange for tribute. However, David Ochterlony, who was in charge of the Rajput states broke the promise to not interfere as in his view interferences would save the states from "ruin". In 1820, the British removed him from his position and replaced him with Charles Metcalfe. For several decades, "non-interference" in internal affairs remained the official policy. However, according to the historian Lynn Zastoupil, the "British never found it possible or desirable to completely withdraw from interference in Rajput affairs".

The medieval bardic chronicles (kavya and masnavi) glorified the Rajput past, presenting warriorhood and honour as Rajput ideals. This later became the basis of the British reconstruction of the Rajput history and the nationalist interpretations of Rajputs' struggles with the Muslim invaders. James Tod, a British colonial official, was impressed by the military qualities of the Rajputs but is today considered to have been unusually enamoured of them. Although the group venerate him to this day, he is viewed by many historians since the late nineteenth century as being a not particularly reliable commentator. Jason Freitag, his only significant biographer, has said that Tod is "manifestly biased".

As per the historian Thomas R. Metcalf, Rajput Taluqdars in Oudh provided a large numbers of leaders to the revolt of 1857 in that region. Kunwar Singh, a Rajput Zamindar was an important leader in Bihar region in the Indian Rebellion of 1857.

Historian Robert Stern points out that in Rajputana, although there were some revolts in the soldiers commanded by British officers the "Rajpur durbar muskeeters and feudal cavalrymen" did not participate in the 1857 revolt at all. But Crispin Bates is of the opinion that Rajput officers had soft corner for the rebels of 1857 fleeing Delhi who were entering into interior areas of then Rajasthan region. He gives examples of rebels who easily found safe havens in villages of Chittor without arrests.

The Rajput practices of female infanticide and sati (widow immolation) were other matters of concern to the British. It was believed that the Rajputs were the primary adherents to these practices, which the British Raj considered savage and which provided the initial impetus for British ethnographic studies of the subcontinent that eventually manifested itself as a much wider exercise in social engineering.

During the British rule their love for pork, i.e. wild boar, was also well known and the British identified them as a group based on this.

The Rajputs were classified as one of the farming and landowning communities by the British in the 1931 census.

Some unrelated communities tried to change their status to Rajput during the Colonial era. William Rowe, discusses an example of a Shudra caste - the Noniyas (caste of salt makers)- from Madhya Pradesh, Uttar Pradesh and Bihar. A large section of this caste that had "become" "Chauhan Rajputs" over three generations in the British Raj era. The more wealthy or advanced Noniyas started by forming the Sri Rajput Pacharni Sabha (Rajput Advancement Society) in 1898 and emulating the Rajput lifestyle. They also started wearing of Sacred thread. Rowe states that at a historic meeting of the caste in 1936, every child in this Noniya section "knew" about their "Rajput heritage". Similarly, Donald Attwood and Baviskar give and example of a caste of shepherds who were formerly Shudras changed their status to Rajput in the Raj era and started wearing the Sacred thread. They are now known as Sagar Rajputs. The scholars consider this example as a case among thousands.

=== Post Independence ===
==== India ====
On India's independence in 1947, the princely states, including those of the Rajput, were given three options: join either India or Pakistan, or remain independent. Rajput rulers of the 22 princely states of Rajputana acceded to newly independent India, amalgamated into the new state of Rajasthan in 1949–1950. Initially the maharajas were granted funding from the Privy purse in exchange for their acquiescence, but a series of land reforms over the following decades weakened their power, and their privy purse was cut off during Indira Gandhi's administration under the 1971 Constitution 26th Amendment Act. The estates, treasures, and practices of the old Rajput rulers now form a key part of Rajasthan's tourist trade and cultural memory.

The Rajput Dogra ruler of Kashmir and Jammu acceded to India in 1947, while retaining his title until the monarchy was abolished in 1971 by the 26th amendment to the Constitution of India.

Before the zamindari abolition, the Rajputs in Oudh formed the major Taluqdars and had controlled over 50 percent of the land in the most districts of the region. Historian Thomas R. Metcalf explains that in the province of Uttar Pradesh, majority of the Taluqdars with moderate to large estates were composed of Rajput caste. He also mentions that Rajputs were only next to Brahmins in the ritual hierarchy and also gave the secular elite of the state. According to him, the community controlled most of the best agricultural land in the region and this also helped the Rajput Taluqdars who were usually the head of the local Rajput clan to gather support over non-Rajput rival in the electoral politics of the state.

===== Affirmative Action =====
The Rajputs, in most of the states, are considered a General caste (forward caste) in India's system of positive discrimination. This means that they have no access to reservations. But they are classified as an Other Backward Class by the National Commission for Backward Classes in the state of Karnataka. Some Rajputs in various states, as with other agricultural castes, demand reservations in Government jobs. In 2016, Sikh Rajputs were added under Backward Classes in Punjab but after protest by the community, the government announced that they will be again put under General Category.

==== Pakistan ====
In West Punjab, the Muslim Rajputs, Jats and Arains are the three dominant agricultural castes, out of which, Rajputs are considered to be at the top of social hierarchy. In Azad Kashmir, they are distributed across the territory and have higher presence in politics. They are among the largest components of Pakistan's army.

== Demographics ==
=== India ===
In 1931, Rajputs comprised 3.7% of British India's population. Currently, the region-wise estimates of Rajputs' share in population are, in descending order: 35% for Uttarakhand, 28% for Himachal Pradesh, 9% in Madhya Pradesh, 7-8% for Uttar Pradesh, 6% for Rajasthan, 5% for Gujarat, 3.45% for Bihar, and 3.4% for Haryana.

=== Pakistan ===
In Pakistan the census is done on a linguistic basis, so it's harder to come across the population of Rajputs, who are mostly Muslim, at a national level, but at a local level the Punjab government has provided the following numbers: Rajputs constitute 32% of the Kasur District, 20% of the Gujranwala District, and 5% of the Lahore District.

Many others Rajputs live in other places of the Punjab province as well in Sindh (including Karachi) and Azad Kashmir, in Azad Kashmir being slightly less 10% than the total population with 500,000. Hindu Rajputs of Sodha clan are concentrated in Umerkot and Tharparkar districts.

=== Nepal ===
Rajputs form 0.16% of Nepal's population or around 50,000 individuals based on 2021 census

== Subdivisions ==
The term "Rajput" denotes a cluster of castes, clans, and lineages. It is a vaguely defined term, and there is no universal consensus on which clans make up the Rajput community. In medieval Rajasthan (the historical Rajputana) and its neighbouring areas, the word Rajput came to be restricted to certain specific clans, based on patrilineal descent and intermarriages. On the other hand, the Rajput communities living in the region to the east of Rajasthan had a fluid and inclusive nature. The Rajputs of Rajasthan eventually refused to acknowledge the Rajput identity claimed by their eastern counterparts, such as the Bundelas. The Rajputs claim to be Kshatriyas or descendants of Kshatriyas, but their actual status varies greatly, ranging from princely lineages to common cultivators.

There are several major subdivisions of Rajputs, known as vansh or vamsha, the step below the super-division jāti These vansh delineate claimed descent from various sources, and the Rajput are generally considered to be divided into three primary vansh: Suryavanshi denotes descent from the solar deity Surya, Chandravanshi (Somavanshi) from the lunar deity Chandra, and Agnivanshi from the fire deity Agni. The Agnivanshi clans include Parmar, Chaulukya (Solanki), Parihar and Chauhan.

Lesser-noted vansh include Udayvanshi, Rajvanshi,. The histories of the various vanshs were later recorded in documents known as vamshāavalīis; André Wink counts these among the "status-legitimizing texts".

Beneath the vansh division are smaller and smaller subdivisions: kul, shakh ("branch"), khamp or khanp ("twig"), and nak ("twig tip"). Marriages within a kul are generally disallowed (with some flexibility for kul-mates of different gotra lineages). The kul serves as the primary identity for many of the Rajput clans, and each kul is protected by a family goddess, the kuldevi. Lindsey Harlan notes that in some cases, shakhs have become powerful enough to be functionally kuls in their own right.

== Culture and ethos ==
The Bengal army of the East India Company recruited heavily from upper castes such as Brahmins and Rajputs of north-central India particularly from the region of Awadh and Bihar. However, after the revolt of 1857 by the Bengal sepoys, the British Indian army shifted recruitment to the Punjab.

=== Military ===
The Rajputs were designated as a Martial Race in the period of the British Raj. This was a designation created by administrators that classified each ethnic group as either "martial" or "non-martial": a "martial race" was typically considered brave and well built for fighting, whilst the remainder were those whom the British believed to be unfit for battle because of their sedentary lifestyles. However, the martial races were also considered politically subservient, intellectually inferior, lacking the initiative or leadership qualities to command large military formations. The British had a policy of recruiting the martial Indians from those who has less access to education as they were easier to control. According to modern historian Jeffrey Greenhunt on military history, "The Martial Race theory had an elegant symmetry. Indians who were intelligent and educated were defined as cowards, while those defined as brave were uneducated and backward". According to Amiya Samanta, the martial race was chosen from people of mercenary spirit (a soldier who fights for any group or country that will pay him/her), as these groups lacked nationalism as a trait.

The Indian Army admitted in 2013 that the 150-strong Presidential Bodyguard comprises only people who are Hindu Jats, Jat Sikhs and Hindu Rajputs. Refuting claims of discrimination, it said that this was for "functional" reasons rather than selection based on caste or religion.

==== Singapore Mutiny ====
During the First World War, Indian Muslim soldiers most of whom were from Rajput background were stationed in Singapore. Upon learning of rumors that they would be sent to fight against Ottoman Empire, ruled by Islamic Caliph, they revolted started a mutiny in Singapore.

=== Deities ===
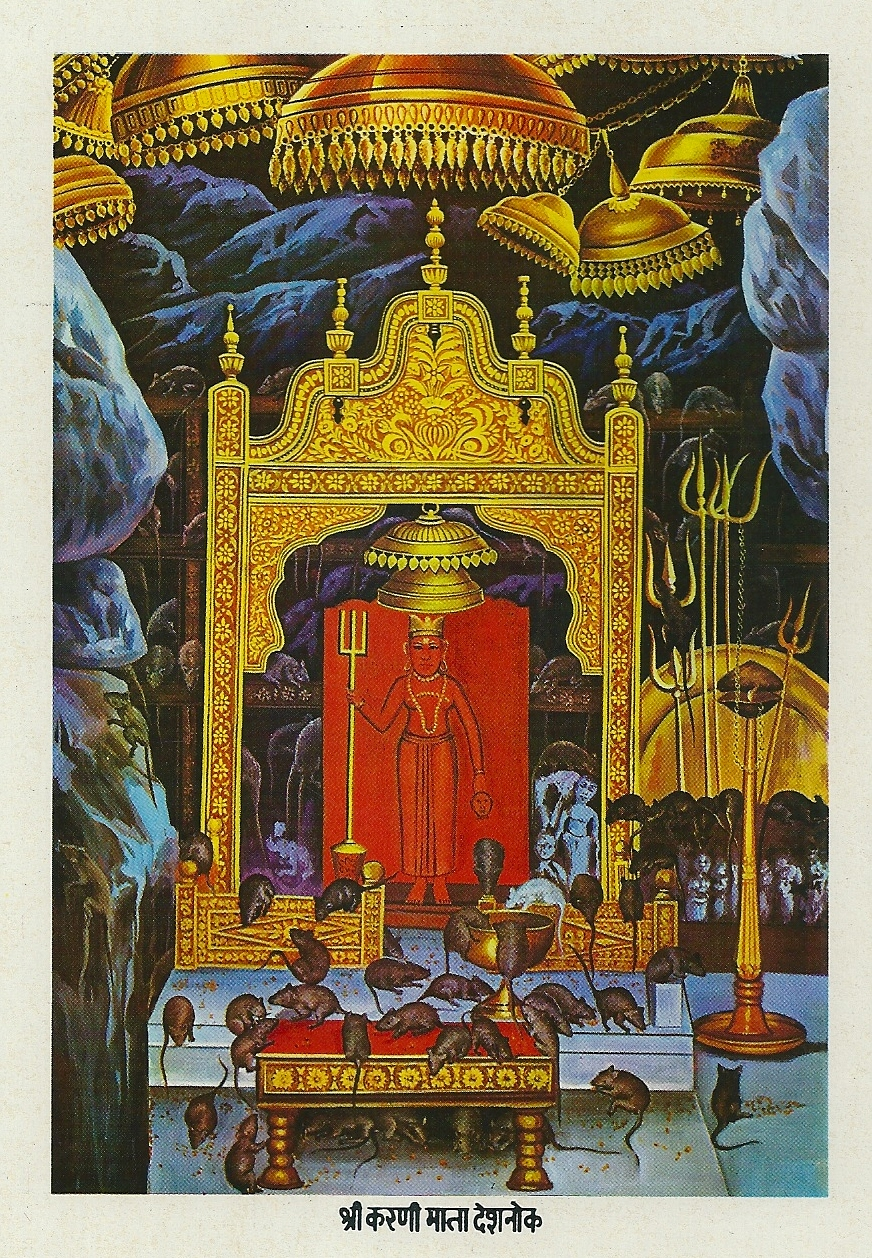
Karni Mata, Hindu Goddess primarily worshipped by Rajputs

One of the most revered deities of Rajputs is Karni Mata, whom many Rajput clans worship as family goddess and link their community's existence or survival in dire times. Lord Shiva (who is very popular all across India) and Goddess Durga are popular deities worshipped by the Hindu Rajputs. Lord Shiva's image is found in the shrines in the homes of many of the Rajput families. In Sikh Rajputs, Guru Ram Rai is quite popular. The fierce form of Goddess Durga, called Sherawali Mata or "she who rides a lion" is popular among Rajput women.

The folk deities of the Rajput are Pabuji, Mallinath, Gogaji and Ramdeo.

=== Rajput lifestyle ===
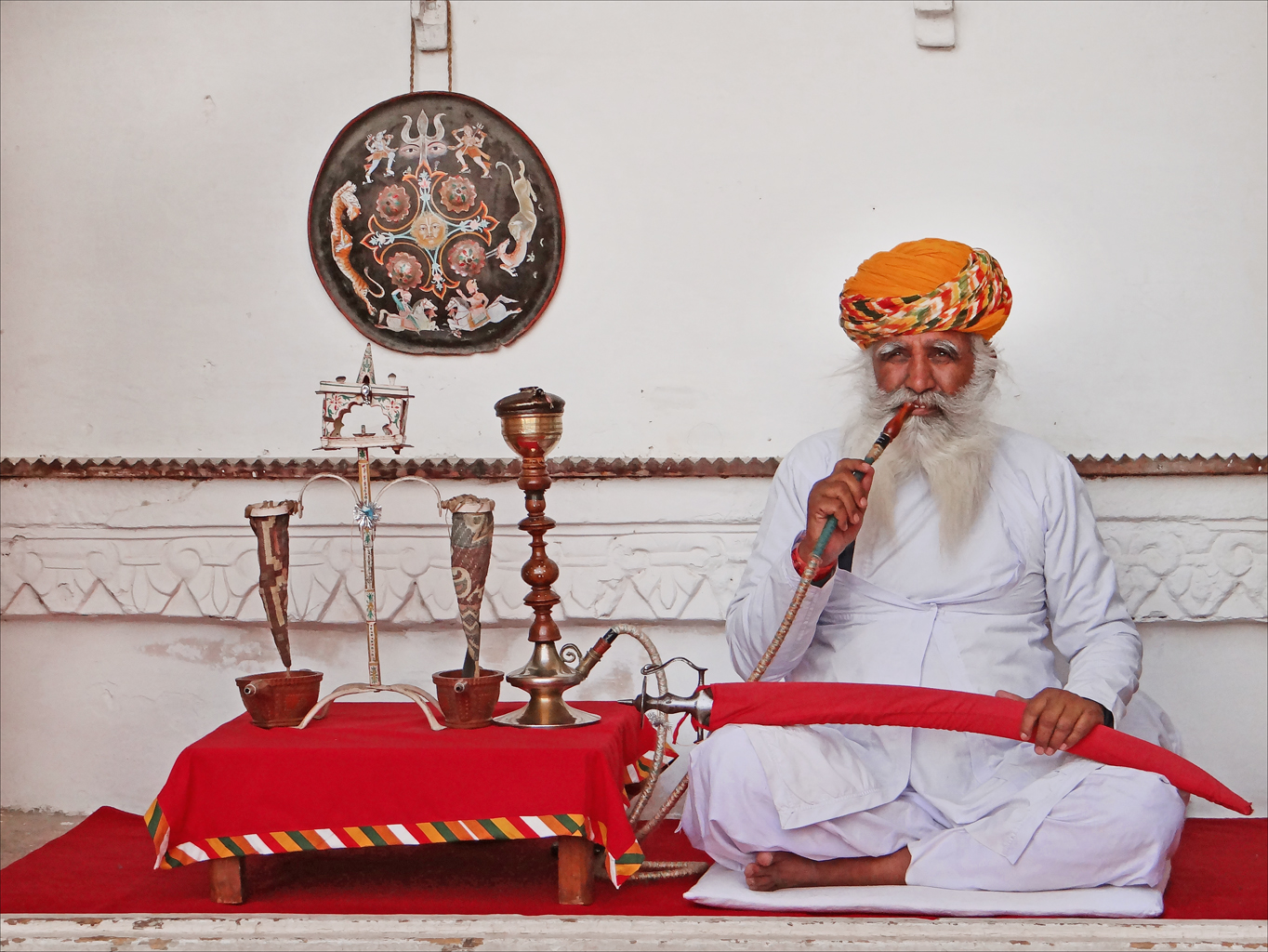
An old Rajput man poses with a hookah in the Maharaja palace of Jodhpur.

The Rajputs of Bihar were inventors of the martial art form Pari Khanda, which includes heavy use of swords and shields. This exercise was later included in the folk dances of Bihar and Jharkhand like that of Chhau dance. On special occasions, a primary chief would break up a meeting of his vassal chiefs with khanda nariyal, the distribution of daggers and coconuts. Another affirmation of the Rajput's reverence for his sword was the Karga Shapna ("adoration of the sword") ritual, performed during the annual Navaratri festival, after which a Rajput is considered "free to indulge his passion for rapine and revenge". The Rajput of Rajasthan also offer a sacrifice of water buffalo or goat to their family goddess (Kuldevta) during Navaratri. The ritual requires slaying of the animal with a single stroke. In the past this ritual was considered a rite of passage for young Rajput men.

The general greeting used by the Rajputs in social gatherings and occasions, 'Jai Mataji' or its regional variants, stands for 'Victory to the Mother Goddess'. This phrase also operated as a military slogan or war cry, often painted on the shields and banners of the jagirdars.

==== Hospitability ====
Harald Tambs-Lyche states that like other martial races of South Asia, Rajputs have a reputation for being hospitable i.e. they welcome and are friendly to guests.

==== Miscellaneous ====
By the late 19th century, there was a shift of focus among Rajputs from politics to a concern with kinship. Many Rajputs of Rajasthan are nostalgic about their past and keenly conscious of their genealogy, emphasising a Rajput ethos that is martial in spirit, with a fierce pride in lineage and tradition.

=== Sati ===
There have been several cases of Sati (burning a widow alive) in Rajasthan from 1943 to 1987. According to an Indian scholar, there are 28 cases since 1947. Although the widows were from several different communities, Rajput widows accounted for 19 cases in Rajasthan. The most famous of these cases is of a Rajput woman named Roop Kanwar. 40,000 Rajputs gathered on the street of Jaipur in October 1987 for supporting her Sati. A pamphlet circulated on that day attacked independent and westernised women who opposed a woman's duty of worshipping her husband as demonstrated by the practice of Sati. This incident again affirmed the low status of women in the Rajput community and the leaders of this pro-sati movement gained in political terms.

=== Female infanticide ===
Female infanticide was practised by Rajputs of low ritual status seeking upward mobility as well as Rajputs of high ritual status. However, there were instances where it was not practised and instances where the mother tried to save the infant girl's life. According to the officials in the early Raj era, in Etawah (Uttar Pradesh), the Gahlot, Bamungors and Bais would kill their daughters if they were rich but profit from getting them married if they were poor.

The methods used of killing the female baby were drowning, strangulation, poisoning, "Asphyxia by drawing the umbilical cord over the baby's face to prevent respiration". Other ways were to leave the infant to die without food and if she survived the first few hours after birth, she was given poison. A common way to poison the infant during breastfeeding was by applying a preparation of poisonous plants like Datura, madar, or poppy to the mother's breast.

Social activists in the early nineteenth century tried to stop these practices by quoting Hindu Shastras:

"to kill one woman is equal to one hundred brahmins, to kill one child is equal to one hundred women, while to kill one hundred children is an offence too heinous for comparison".

Infanticide has unintended consequences. The Rajput clans of lower ritual status married their daughters to Rajput men of higher ritual status who had lost females due to infanticide. Thus, the Rajputs of lower ritual status had to remain unmarried or resorted to other practices like marrying widows, levirate marriages (marrying brother's widow) as well as marrying low-caste women such as Jats and Gujars or nomads. This resulted in widening the gap between Rajputs of low ritual status and Rajputs of high ritual status.

In the late 19th century, to curb the practice, the act VIII of 1870 was introduced. A magistrate suggested:

"Let every Rajput be thoroughly convinced that he will go to jail for ten years for every infant girl he murders, with as much certainty as he would feel about being hanged if he were to kill her when grown up, and the crime will be stamped out very effectually; but so long as the Government show any hesitation in dealing rigorously with criminals, so long will the Rajpoot think he has chance of impunity and will go on killing girls like before."

However, the practical application of the law faced hurdles. It was difficult to prove culpability as in some cases the Rajput men were employed at a distance although the infants could be killed at their connivance. In most cases, Rajput men were imprisoned only for a short time. Between 1888 and 1889, the proportion of girl children rose to 40%. However, the act was abolished in 1912 as punishments were unable to stop infanticide. A historian concludes that "the act, which only scraped the surface of the problem had been unable to civilize or bring about a social change in a cultural world devaluing girl children". In addition to Rajputs, it was observed that Jats and Ahirs also practised infanticide.

=== Brideprice or Bridewealth weddings ===
"Bridewealth" is discussed in north Indian Rajputs of 19th-century India by the historian Malavika Kasturi. She states that Rajputs belonging to social groups where their women worked in the fields received Bridewealth from the groom's family. She adds that evidence shows that the assumption made by officials of the time that female infanticide among clans was a result of poverty and inability to pay dowry is incorrect.

Rajput women could be incorporated into Mughal Harem and this defined the Mughals as overlords over the Rajput clans. The Sisodia clan of Mewar was an exception as they refused to send their women to the Mughal Harem which resulted in siege and mass suicide at Chittor.

Historically, members from the Rajput ruling clans of Rajasthan have also practised polygamy and also took many women they enslaved as concubines from the battles which they won. During numerous armed conflicts in India, women were taken captives, enslaved and even sold, for example, the capture and selling of Marwar's women by Jaipur's forces in the battle between Jaipur state and Jodhpur state in 1807. The enslaved women were referred to by different terms according to the conditions imposed on them, for example, a "domestic slave" was called davri; a dancer was called a patar; a "senior female slave–retainer in the women's quarters" was called badaran or vadaran; a concubine was called khavasin; and a woman who was "permitted to wear the veil" like Rajput queens was called a pardayat.

The term chakar was used for a person serving their "superior" and chakras contained complete families from specific "occupational groups" like Brahmin women, cooks, nurses, tailors, washer–women. For children born from the "illegitimate union" of Rajputs and their "inferiors", the terms like goli and darogi were used for females and gola and daroga were used for males. The "courtly chronicles" say that women who were perceived to be of "higher social rank" were assigned to the "harems of their conquerors with or without marriage". The chronicles from the Rajput courts have recorded that women from Rajput community had also faced such treatment by the Rajputs from the winning side of a battle. There are also a number of records between the late 16th to mid–19th century of the Rajputs immolating the queens, servants, and slaves of a king upon his death. Ramya Sreenivasan also gives and example of a Jain concubine who went from being a servant to a superior concubine called Paswan

According to Priyanka Khanna, with Marwar's royal Rajput households, the women who underwent concubinage also included women from the Gujar, Ahir, Jat, Mali, Kayastha, and Darji communities of that region. These castes of Marwar claimed Rajput descent based on the "census data of Marwar, 1861". However research by modern scholars on the forms of "slavery and servitude" imposed by ruling clans of Rajasthan's Rajputs between the 16th and early–19th centuries on the captured women faces hurdles because of the "sparse information", "uneven record–keeping", and "biased nature of historical records". Ravana Rajput community of today was one such slave community.

The male children of such unions were identified by their father's names and in some cases as 'dhaibhai'(foster-brothers) and incorporated into the household. Examples are given where they helped their step-brothers in war campaigns. The female children of concubines and slaves married Rajput men in exchange for money or they ended up becoming dancing girls. The scarcity of available brides due to female infanticide led to the kidnapping of low caste women who were sold for marriage to the higher clan Rajputs. Since these "sales" were genuinely for the purpose of marriage, they were considered legal. The lower clans also faced scarcity of brides in which case they married women such as those from Gujar and Jat communities. Semi nomadic communities also married their daughters to Rajput bridegrooms for money in some cases.

Of note, the mistreatment or enslavement of women was not unique to Rajputs. Datta notes Bachanan's observation in 18th-century northern-India that, other than the Rajputs, Khatris and Kayasthas also "openly kept women slaves of any pure tribe". The offsprings of these women formed one matrimonial group. Similarly, affluent Muslim families in Bihar kept both male and female slaves – called Nufurs and Laundis respectively.

These Rajput groups (khasa) of Uttarakhand today were formally classified Shudra but had successfully converted to Rajput status during the rule of Chand Rajas (that ended in 1790). Similarly, the Rajputs of Gharwal were originally of low ritual status and did not wear the sacred thread until the 20th century.

=== Arts ===
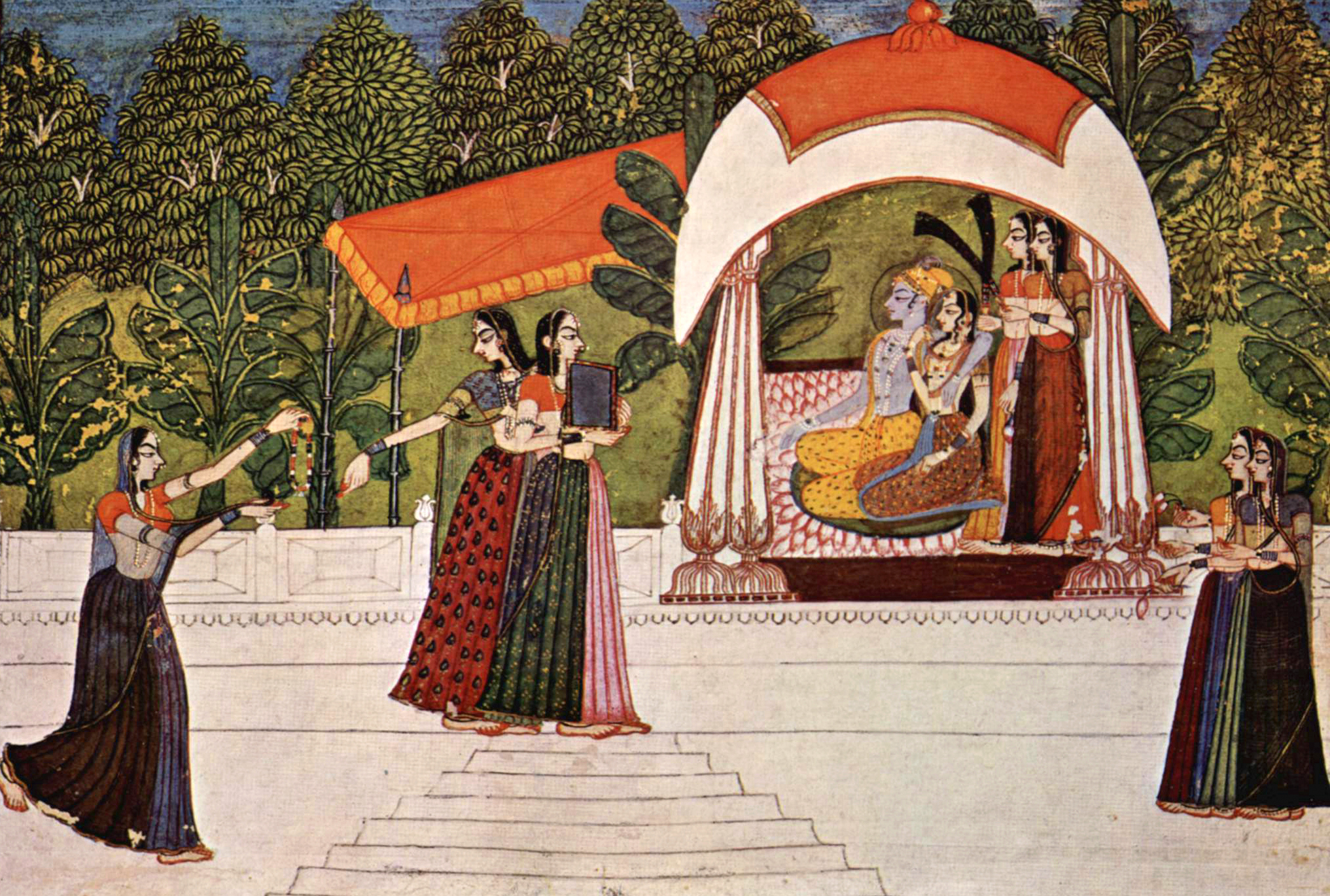
An 18th-century Rajput painting by the artist Nihâl Chand

The term Rajput painting refers to works of art created at the Rajput-ruled courts of Rajasthan, Central India, and the Punjab Hills. The term is also used to describe the style of these paintings, distinct from the Mughal painting style.

According to Ananda Coomaraswamy, Rajput painting symbolised the divide between Muslims and Hindus during Mughal rule. The styles of Mughal and Rajput painting are oppositional in character. He characterised Rajput painting as "popular, universal and mystic".

== In popular culture ==
Hindi cinema (Bollywood) has produced several films based on Rajput history and legendary Rajput heroes, highlighting their valor, honor, and cultural legacy.

- Rajput
- Meera
- Padmaavat
- Samrat Prithviraj

Kesari Veer is a 2025 Indian Hindi-language historical action film directed by Prince Dhiman. The film is co-produced by Rajen Chauhan, Heena Chauhan, Suhraj Chauhan and Ohm Chauhan. Written, co-directed and produced by Kanubhai Chauhan of Chauhan Studios, the film stars Suniel Shetty, Vivek Oberoi, Sooraj Pancholi and Akanksha Sharma. It tells the story of Rajput warrior Hamirji Gohil, who fought against the Tughlaq empire to protect the Somnath Temple from destruction.

== See also ==
- Rajputana
- List of Rajput dynasties and states
- Rajputana Rifles
- Rajput Regiment
- Rajput clans
- Kumaoni Rajput
- List of Rajputs
- Garhwali Rajput
- Muslim Rajputs
- Rajput architecture
