= Waki, Jaoli =

Waki
- town
- Location in Maharashtra, India
- Coordinates: 17.788°N 73.743°E
- Country: India
- State: Maharashtra

Population (2011)
  - Total: 272

Languages
  - Official: Marathi
- Time zone: UTC+5:30 (IST)

Waki is a gram panchayat in the Jaoli block of the Satara district of Maharashtra, India.

It was known as "Yaukee" during the British Raj, and its population in 1905 was 908. By 2011, it had declined to 272.
