= Jaoli State =

Former Indian principality

Coordinates: 17.99°N 74.42°E

- Jagir
- 1508–1658
- History
  - Established by Parsoji Moré: 1508
  - Annexation by Shivaji: 1658
Preceded by	Succeeded by
Bijapur Sultanate	Maratha Empire

Jaoli (or Jawali) principality was a Jagir of Maratha Morè/Maurya (clan) which is located in the western part of the present day Maharashtra state.

== History ==
The state was centred on the valley surrounding Jaoli. Parsoji Moré a high ranking Maratha noble under Yusuf Adil Shah was sent in konkan to finish of the remnants of Shirke chiefs in konkan, by doing so he established the Jaoli state as a vassal of Adilshahi Sultanate and received the title Chandra Rao which his descendants continued to bear. Parsoji was the son of Bajirao Moré who was a noble under the Vijayanagara Empire and a descent of More of Konkan. In the 1650s, it was ruled by Yashwantrao Moré who called himself the king of Konkan. He claimed to rule by the divine sanction of the god Mahabaleshwar (an aspect of Shiva), and had been formally recognized as the local Raje (king) by the Adil Shah.

Around 1656, Shivaji - Son of Shahaji (another commander of Adil Shah) forcibly captured Jaoli in the Battle of Javali. Shivaji, who had similarly captured other territories in the area, justified his action to the Adil Shah, arguing that he governed these territories better than the deposed rulers did. However, the Adil Shah doubted Shivaji's loyalty, and sent his general Afzal Khan against Shivaji. Shivaji defeated Afzal Khan, and went on to establish an independent kingdom that evolved into the Maratha Empire.

== See also ==
- Maratha Empire
- Jawali, Maharashtra
- Mauryas of konkana
- Maurya Empire
