= Garhwali Rajput =

Indian caste

- Classification: Subcaste of Rajputs
- Religions: Hinduism
- Languages: Garhwal, Sanskrit
- Original state: Uttarakhand
- Ethnicity: Indo-Aryan
- Lineage: Suryavanshi, Chandravanshi
- Related groups: Kumaoni Rajput, Rajputs of Nepal
- Historical grouping: Khasas
- Kingdom (original): Garhwal Kingdom

Garhwali Rajput, also referred to Rajputs of Garhwal region of Uttrakhand who held considerable power in the Garhwal region of Uttarakhand, from around the 9th century till the conquest of Garhwal by the Garhwal Kingdom.

== Clans ==
List of Rajput clans in Garhwal:

- Negi
- Panwar
- Pawar
- Bisht
- Chand
- Rawat
- Rana

== Notable people ==
- Bipin Rawat, first Chief of Defence Staff of Indian Armed Forces.
- Sher Singh Rana, Indian assassin and politician.
- Yogi Adityanath, 21st Chief Minister of Uttar Pradesh.
