= Karki (clan) =

Rajput clan from Kumaon

Karki (also referred to as Kharku) is a Rajput clan from the Kumaon region of Uttarakhand.

== History ==
The Karkis are descendants of the junior members of the Katyuri dynasty and have also had some influence in former times. One of them, Sukhram Karki held power in the early part of the seventeenth century during the reign of Raja Vijay Chand.
