= Kumaoni Rajput =

Indian caste

Regions with significant populations
- Uttarakhand

Languages
- Hindi • Kumaoni

Religion
- Hinduism

Related ethnic groups
- Garhwali Rajput, Kumaoni people

Kumaoni Rajput, also referred to Rajputs of Kumaun region of Uttrakhand who held considerable power in the Kumaon region of Uttarakhand. They are the most populated community in the Kumaon and were the landowning caste in the region. They were highly represented in the British Indian Army and formed major part of the Kumaon Regiment.

== Kumaoni Rajput clans ==
List of Rajput clans in Kumaon:

- Adhikari
- Aswal
- Basera
- Bhandari
- Bisht
- Chand
- Deopa
- Kalakoti
- Kanyal
- Karki
- Mahara
- Manral
- Negi
- Panwar
- Rautela
