= Morè (clan) =

Indian clan and surname

Morè is the name of a Maratha clan as well as a Mahar clan from the state of Maharashtra. Members of the More Maratha clan as well as the Mahar clan use the clan name as their surname. The totem associated with the clan is a peacock. Members of the Mahar clan worshipping the same Totem cannot intermarry. 'More' is also an exogamous clan in the Bhils of Maharashtra.

According to Kosambi, the adoption of the title 'Chandrarav More' in the Marathas may have been inspired because of the admiration for Candragupta Maurya from the north and locals even to the south of Goa had knowledge of the "petty 'Mauryans'".

== Mores of Javli ==
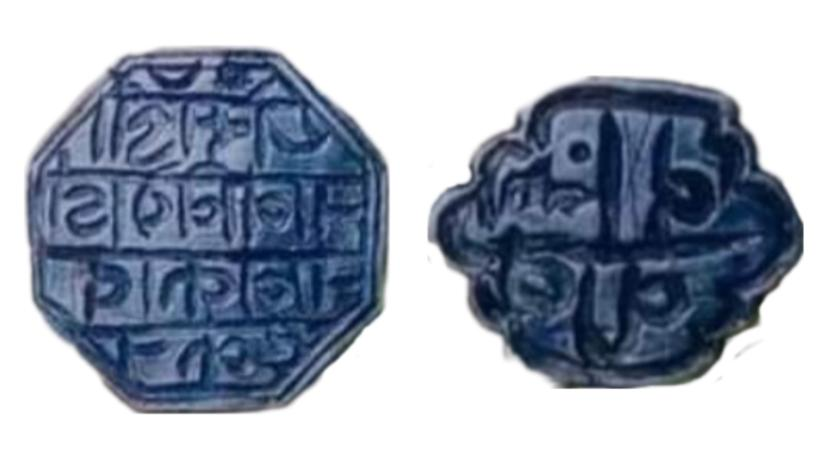
Coins issued by the Morè rulers of Javli or Jayavalli

The Maratha Morè clan of Javli or Jayavalli came to prominence early in the 16th century when the first sultan of Bijapur granted them the kingdom (Jagir) of Javli.This branch was called the Chandrarao Morè branch of Javli. The ruler of the kingdom had a title of Chandrarao. The first recognized Chandrarao was Raja Parsojiraje Bajirao More who was given the jagir of Javli due to his immense valour of killing a tiger alone in a hunt with Adilshah. Javli, near the modern day hill station of Mahabaleshwar, occupied a strategic position in the eastern foothills of the Northern Sahyadri mountain range. Within 60 miles length of the mountains there are eight passes through which trade flowed from the coastal Konkan ports of Chiplun and Colaba on their way to the inlands of Deccan. For eight generations, the Morès amassed great fortune by taxing the trade with a help of a force of 12,000 soldiers.

=== Controversy on conquest of Javli by Shivaji ===
Modern historian Dipesh Chakrabarty writes about the controversial circumstances in which Javali was obtained by Shivaji, the founder of Maratha Empire in 1656. Javli was very important to Shivaji Maharaj for the founding of his Kingdom. Upon review of the documents, prominent historian Sarkar concluded that "the acquisition of Javli was the result of deliberate murder and organized treachery on part of Shivaji". However, Chakrabarty says that this conclusion did not sit well with the nationalist historians from Maharashtra of Sarkar's time. This was despite the fact that all the old Hindu biographers agreed that it was an act of premeditated murder. The remaining son of Chandra rao continued his fight against Shivaji by seeking refuge with the Adil shah. Other members of the clan joined the Mughals and helped the Mughal general, Jai Singh in his campaign against Shivaji. Historian Gordon agrees with Sarkar and concludes based on historical documents that Shivaji had no legal rights to Javali hence this was an act of "conscious treachery" on his part. and Indian historian Satish Chandra also comes to the same conclusion.
