= Pandurang Narayan Salunkhe =

Indian independence activist (1917–2007)

Shri Pandurang Narayan Salunkhe (12 Sep 1917 - 20 May 2007) - popularly known as Dada, was an Indian independence activist (Freedom Fighter) representing Satara district Patan Taluka. Earlier, he was a member of Prati-sarkar formed by krantisinh Nana Patil.

== British Raj period ==
Pandurang Narayan Salunkhe was born on 12 September 1917 at Maldan Tal- Patan. Salunkhe was imprisoned three to four times during the struggle with the British Raj from 1939 to 1942. He was active mainly in Patan, south Karad Talukas in Satara Districts. For few years 6-7 he was arrested by British Government in the year 1942.

== Got Tamrpatra from Maharashtra Sarkar ==
He was an Indian independence activist so he got Tamrapatra from Maharashtra sarkar in the year 1975. Also he got much and more local awards.

== Death ==
He died in his home at the age 90 on 20 May 2007, at Maldan Tal- Patan District Satara.
