= Kadam (clan) =

Royal Maratha Clan among 96K Maratha Clan System

Kadam, also Kardam, is a clan of the Marathas, Kunbis and Kolis in some parts of Maharashtra, Karnataka, Andhra Pradesh, Telangana and Goa states of India.

== See also ==
- Maratha clan system
