= Salunkhe =

Indian Maratha clan

Salunkhe (साळुंखे) is a prominent Maratha clan mostly from Maharashtra and neighbouring states.

They have scattered through regions of Maratha dominance such as Beed, Akola, Buldana, Parbhani, Jalna, Aurangabad, Chalisgaon, Jalgaon, Solapur, Latur, Nagpur, Amravati, Baroda, Gwalior, Satara, and Kolhapur and some other parts of India.

== History ==
Salunkhe or Salunke is the vernacular form of the word Chaulukya.

In the inscription, which were written in Sanskrit, it was spelled Saluki, Saluke, Salukki in inscriptions, but in local language it got variations. The Salunkhe Maratha clan belongs to the Kshatriya varna. The descendants of the Chaulukya dynasty came to be known by the Salunkhe surname in Maharashtra and Karnataka. Salukya/Salunkhe are the corrupt forms of Chaulukya surname.

== Notables ==
- Shrimant Sundarrao Salunkhe, Maratha leader and former Deputy Chief Minister of Maharashtra
- Pandurang Narayan Salunkhe, Freedom fighter from Satara district
