= Stewart N. Gordon =

American historian

Stewart Gordon
- Born: January 2, 1945 (age 81); Akron, Ohio, US
- Education: University of Michigan (BA, MA, PhD)
- Occupations: Historian, Writer, Lecturer
- Spouse: Sara A. Duvall (m. 1970)
- Website: stewartgordonhistorian.com

Stewart N. Gordon (born January 2, 1945) is an American-born historian, teacher, lecturer, writer, and consultant.

== Biography ==
Gordon was trained at the University of Michigan (BA, MA, PhD) in Asian history and sociology.

He is currently a senior research fellow of the center for South Asian Studies at the University of Michigan with specialties in pre-colonial South Asian history, trans-regional Asian history and World history.

Gordon has consulted with several public school districts on new strategies for the teaching of World history. He has consulted for series on the History Channel and the Discovery Channel. His invited lectures include Harvard University, Columbia University, University of Pennsylvania, University of Michigan, University of Chicago, University of California Berkeley, University of Texas at Austin, the Los Angeles County Museum of Art, American Geographical Society, University of Pune (India), and the Asia Society.

He has received a Woodrow Wilson National Fellowship Foundation Scholarship, Fulbright Program Fellowships, American Institute of Indian Studies Fellowships, an American Geographical Society Research Fellowship, Social Science Research Council Fellowship, and an Earhart Foundation Fellowship. In 2015 he was inducted as an honorary fellow of the Asiatic Society of Mumbai.

== Work ==
=== Social structure and social disruption ===
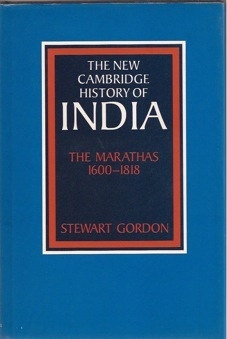
The Marathas 1600–1818

His early publications dealt with social structure and social disruption in eighteenth century India, using documents in Modi script from the eighteenth century Maratha Empire. Re-current themes in this research were networks and supply chains, the impact of military recruiting and financing, overseas demand for Indian goods, and the meaning of conquest. This strand of research culminated in the publication of the book Marathas, Marauders, and State Formation in Eighteenth Century India (Oxford University Press, 1994) a set of historical essays that challenges assumptions about the century between the Mughal empire and the British colonial period in India. He is the author of The New Cambridge History of India : Marathas 1600–1818 (Cambridge University Press, 1993), which series is considered the world authority on the history of India.

=== Trans-Asian themes ===
In the last two decades his interests have widened to trans-Asian themes, particularly features of elite culture that spanned Asia, the Middle East, Central Asia, and parts of Europe in the Middle Ages. He has explored ceremonial robes of honor, the use of the royal umbrella, the history of chess, and shared cuisine. The first fruits of these wider themes were two books on ceremonial honorific robing, Robes and Honor: The Medieval World of Investiture (Palgrave Press, 2001) a collection of essays on the custom across Asia and into Europe, and Robes of Honor: Khjil'at in Pre-Colonial and Colonial India(Oxford University Press, 2003) on robing in South Asia.

=== World history ===
More recently he has been interested in the historical movement along the routes of pilgrims, armies, plants, ideas, religions, marriage partners, and staple commodities. This focus is reflected in a recent book, When Asia was the World (Da Capo, 2008), which uses indigenous travel memoirs to elucidate the Asian world, 500–1500. This book has been translated into Chinese, Korean, Indonesian, Arabic, and Italian. Recent articles include the ecological impact of pre-colonial war in South Asia and a broad survey of the major rivers that come off the plateau of Tibet. In 2015 University Press of New England published Gordon's A History of the World in Sixteen Shipwrecks. It was shortlisted for the Mountbatten Prize, sponsored by the Maritime Society (England)for the best maritime-themed book of the year. A Turkish translation will appear in 2015.

Current interests are the mental constructs and physical aspects of historical routes, which has resulted in a book entitled Routes: How the Pathways of Ideas and Goods Shaped Our World (University of California Press, 2012). This volume widens the comparative focus to include, for example, the Mississippi River, the Erie Canal, the Inca road system, and the Nile. He also has recently written a book on comparative slavery outside the Atlantic World entitled Shackles of Iron: Slavery in World History (Hackett, 2016). Cognitive geography is a strong interest, that is, the mental maps people carry about places near and far.

In 2022, he published A History of the World in Seven Themes.

=== Other interests and activities ===
In addition to scholarly articles, Gordon has written for popular audiences, including a book on the classic American ocean liners SS Independence and SS Constitution, Sunlight & Steel (Prow Press, 2000) and articles for Saudi Aramco World magazine. He has served as a specialist historical adviser for the History Channel, the Walt Disney Company, the Delta Queen Steamboat Company, and more than 30 history-themed hotels and restaurants in the United States and Europe.
