= Madhavrao Sapre =

Indian writer and translator (1871-1926)

- Cover of Madhavrao Sapre ki Kahaniyan, featuring Madhavrao Sapre seated, with Bal Gangadhar Tilak in the background
- Born: June 19, 1871; Patharia, Damoh district, British India (now in Madhya Pradesh, India)
- Died: April 23, 1926 (aged 54); Raipur, Central Provinces, British India (now in Chhattisgarh, India)
- Education: University of Calcutta
- Occupations: Writer, journalist, social reformer
- Writing career
- Language: Hindi
- Years active: 1900–1926
- Notable works: Ek Tokri Bhar Mitti (First Hindi short story) Vigyan Shabdkosh (Science Dictionary)
- Literary movement: Indian independence movement, Hindi journalism

Madhavrao Sapre (June 1871 – 23 April 1926) was an Indian writer, journalist, and social reformer, widely regarded as a pioneer of Hindi short stories. He is best known for Ek Tokri Bhar Mitti, considered the first Hindi short story. His contributions extended beyond storytelling to include editing, translation, lexicography, and institution-building.

Sapre played a key role in developing economic terminology in Hindi and edited the Vigyan Shabdkosh (Science Dictionary) in 1902 under the Kashi Nagari Pracharini Sabha. Many scholars also consider him one of the first Hindi literary critics.

== Early life ==
Sapre was born in June 1871 in Patharia, Damoh district, in present-day Madhya Pradesh. He belonged to a Marathi-speaking family and completed his education in Bilaspur, graduating from Calcutta University in 1899. After initially working as a tehsildar, he left his job to engage in activities related to India's independence movement and Hindi literary development.

== Career ==
In 1900, Sapre founded Chhattisgarh Mitra, one of the earliest Hindi magazines, from Pendra in present-day Chhattisgarh. Although Chhattisgarh Mitra had a short run, it is credited with laying the foundation of Hindi journalism in the region. He edited several Hindi language journals, including the Hindi edition of Kesari. He translated notable works of Marathi literature into Hindi, including Bal Gangadhar Tilak's Geeta Rahasya and Samarth Ramdas's Dasbodh.

He was instrumental in standardizing Hindi economic terminology and compiling a science dictionary (Vigyan Shabdkosh) for the Kashi Nagari Pracharini Sabha. He also started the Hindi Mathematical Magazine in Nagpur in 1906 to support Hindi literary writers, however, it was shut down by the British government due to its nationalist content in 1908.

In 1920, Sapre founded the Hindi Mandir in Jabalpur. In 1921, he founded the National School and established the first girls' school, Janaki Devi Mahila Pathshala, in Raipur. In 1924, he chaired the Hindi Sahitya Sammelan session in Dehradun. He died on 23 April 1926 at Tatipara, Raipur.

For the past twenty-five years, Pt. Madhavrao Sapre had been a cornerstone of Hindi, contributing significantly to the institutions of literature, society, and politics. He traveled across the villages of the region, using his pen to voice the needs of the nation and the suffering of the poor, oppressed by foreign rule. He immersed himself in religion, driving it toward national service, and humbly erased his own presence to uplift those around him, ensuring their significance and making them enduring.

— Makhanlal Chaturvedi wrote in Karmveer on 11th September 1926 about Madhavrao Sapre's struggles, literary contributions, and his role in Hindi journalism, social service, and political activism.

== Notable works ==
- Swadeshi Andolan aur Boycott
- Europe ke Itihas Se Seekhne Yogya Baatein
- Hamare Samajik Hras ke Kuch Karanon ka Vichar
- Madhavrao Sapre ki Kahaniyan (Edited by Devi Prasad Verma)

Translations

- Hindi Dasbodh (Marathi work by Samarth Ramdas)
- Geeta Rahasya (By Bal Gangadhar Tilak)
- Mahabharat Mimamsa (Marathi work by Chintaman Vinayak Vaidya)

== Legacy ==
=== Madhavrao Sapre Smriti Newspaper Museum ===
On 19 June 1984, the "Madhavrao Sapre Smriti Samacharpatra Sangrahalaya Evam Shodh Sansthan" was established in Bhopal to preserve the nation's intellectual heritage. It was named to honor Madhavrao Sapre's contributions to Hindi journalism and literature.

=== National Creativity Award ===
The Chhattisgarh government instituted the "Pandit Madhavrao Sapre Rashtriya Rachnatmakta Samman" (National Creativity Award) to recognize excellence in creative writing and contributions to Hindi literature. The award is presented annually by the state's Public Relations Department.

== Bibliography ==
- Sukla, Santosha Kumara (2010-01-01). Patrakarita Ke Yug Nirmata: Madhavrao Sapre: Bestseller Book by Santosha Kumara Sukla: Patrakarita Ke Yug Nirmata: Madhavrao Sapre (in Hindi). Prabhat Prakashan. ISBN 978-81-7315-754-7.
