= Siddharameshwar =

Indian guru

Shree Siddharameshwar Maharaj

Sri Siddharameshwar Maharaj (1888–1936) (Note: Nisargadatta Maharaj Biography enlightened-spirituality.org) was a guru in the Inchagiri Sampradaya founded by his guru Bhausaheb Maharaj, a branch of the Navnath Sampradaya, the 'Nine Masters' tradition in India. (Note: Navnath Sampradaya) His disciples included Nath teachers Nisargadatta Maharaj, Ranjit Maharaj, Kaadsiddheshwar, and Ganapatrao Maharaj Kannur.

== Biography ==
Siddharameshwar was born in 1888 in the village Pathri, Solapur, India, making him one of the contemporaries of Sri Ramana Maharshi. Since childhood, he had been credited with a sharp intellect and a natural ability to learn and absorb knowledge; in 1906, in Karnataka, (Note: Sadguru Shri Ranjit Maharaj, History) he was initiated into Inchagiri by his guru Shri Bhausaheb Maharaj, who taught mantra meditation as the way to reach Final Reality. (Note: nondualite.free.fr, Shri Sadguru Siddharameshwar Maharaj)

In 1920, Siddharameshwar started to set out on "the Bird's Path", the fast way to attain realization, six years after Bhauhaseb Maharaj had died. His fellow-students opposed this course of action; but, eventually, Siddharameshwar succeeded in attaining realization by himself.

Siddharameshwar died from an infection on 9 November 1936 (Ekadashi, 11th day in the latter half of Ashwin), at the age of 48, giving his understanding to his disciples. It is said that dozens of his disciples became self-realized through his clear and lucid teaching. His samadhi shrine today is located at Basavan Bagewadi, Vijaypur in Karnataka.

== Teachings ==
=== Atma Vidya ===
Atma Vidya ("Self-Knowledge") is the central theme in Siddharameshwar Maharaj's teachings. In Master Key to Self-Realization he describes how the teaching of Vedanta is transmitted to a student. It starts with a meeting with a guru, who tells the student about the teachings. Thereafter, a mantra is used by the student to meditate and make the mind more receptive; when this has been accomplished to the guru's satisfaction, he explains the teaching further, which has to be realized experientially by the student.

The student has to turn away his mind from external objects and the gross body, and "turn within". By realizing that objects have only a temporary appearance, it becomes possible to develop detachment and to clear one's mental attitude from pride. This is a necessary step to develop Self-Knowledge, the renunciation of the impermanent, and the acceptance of the permanent.

=== The koshas ===
To realize this Self-Knowledge, an investigation of the four bodies has to be made to discover whence the notion of "I" comes. (Note: According to the Vedanta doctrine of Sarira, or the "Three Bodies Doctrine", the human being is composed of three sariras, or five koshas ("bodies"): Sthula sarira, the Gross body, also called the Annamaya Kosha; Suksma sarira, the Subtle body, composed of: Pranamaya Kosha (Vital breath or Energy), Manomaya Kosha (Mind); Vijnanamaya Kosha (Intellect); Karana sarira, the Causal body, the Anandamaya Kosha (Bliss)) Siddharameshwar Maharaj discerns four bodies:

1. The Physical Gross Body
2. The Subtle body:
  1. the Five Senses of Action (hands, feet, mouth, genitals, and anus)
  2. the Five Senses of Knowledge (eyes, ears, nose, tongue, and skin)
  3. the Five Pranas or vital breaths (vyana vayu, samana vayu, udana vayu, apana vaya, prana vayu)
  4. the Mind (manas)
  5. The Intellect (Buddhi)
3. The Causal Body, characterized by "emptiness", "ignorance" and "darkness" (Note: Compare kenosis and Juan de la Cross' Dark Night of the Soul.)
4. The Great-Causal Body, the knowledge of "I am" that cannot be described, the state after Ignorance and Knowledge, or Turiya state

By subsequently identifying with the three lower bodies, investigating them, and discarding identification with them when it has become clear that they are not the "I", the sense of "I am" beyond knowledge and Ignorance becomes clearly established.

=== The Bird's way ===
The teachings of Siddharameshwar have been called Vihangam Marg, "the Bird's Way", the direct path to Self-discovery, (Note: sadguru.us, The Bird's way Archived 30 March 2015 at the Wayback Machine) (Note: See also Ranjit Maharaj's "Illusion vs. Reality Dialogues with Shri Ranjit Maharaj on the Stateless State", dialogue of 3 May 1998. Available at Siddharameshwar Maharaj's discovery of "the Bird's way") in contrast to Bhausaheb Maharaj's teachings, which have been called Pipilika Marg , "the Ant's way", the way of meditation:

Ranjit Maharaj: There are two ways to realize: the bird's way or ant's way. By meditation (or ant's way) one can realize. The word or name has so much power. The name you were given by your parents has done so many things. Mantra is given by the master, but it is a very long way for the understanding. By chanting or saying the mantra you can go to the final reality. There are only two things: one is reality, the other is illusion. One word only can wipe out illusion.

So one thought [i.e. mantra] from the Master who has realized is sufficient to realize. It is a very lengthy way, that's the only thing. So my Master found the shortest way, by thinking. By unthinking you have become the smallest creature, and by thinking you can become the greatest of the great, why not? If you don't have the capacity to understand by thinking, the bird's way, then you can go by way of meditation. It is the long way and you have to meditate for many hours a day. People say they meditate, but most don't know how to meditate. They say that God is one and myself is another one, that is the duality. It will never end that way.

So one word is sufficient from the Master. Words can cut words, thoughts can cut thoughts in a fraction of a second. It can take you beyond the words, that is yourself. In meditation you have to eventually submerge your ego, the meditator, and the action of the meditation, and finally yourself. It is a long way, and in this world now people have no time to do that. The world is going so fast now. So my Master found the shortest way. (Note: From sadguru.us: "The way of meditation is a long arduous path while the Bird's Way is a clear direct path of Self investigation, Self exploration, and using thought or concepts as an aid to understanding and Self-Realization. Sometimes this approach is also called the Reverse Path. What Reverse Path indicates is the turning around of one's attention away from objectivity to the more subjective sense of one's Beingness. (Note: Compare Jinul's "tracing back the radiance".Buswell, Robert E. (1991), Tracing Back the Radiance: Chinul's Korean Way of Zen, University of Hawaii Press, ISBN 978-0-8248-1427-4) With the Bird's Way, first one's mind must be made subtle. This is generally done with some initial meditation on a mantra or phrase which helps the aspirant to step beyond the mental/conceptual body, using a concept to go beyond conceptualization.")

=== Usage of classical texts ===
Siddharameshwar Maharaj used four core texts upon which to give sermons: (Note: RANJIT MAHARAJ | meeting siddharameshwar)

- Dasbodh of Saint Shri Samarth Ramdas
- the Yoga Vasistha
- the "Eknathi Bhagwat" of Sant Eknath
- "Sadachara" of Shri Madhvacharya

== Lineage ==
Siddharameshwar Maharaj's preachings were further spread around the globe by his most revered disciples:

- Sri Ranjit Maharaj (1913–2000) was with Sri Siddharameshwar Maharaj for 12 years from the young age of 12 until the age of 24 (Note: Sri Ranjit Maharaj Archived 11 January 2008 at the Wayback Machine)
- Sri Nisargadatta Maharaj (1897–1981) was with him for 2 1/2 years, 1933–1936.
- Shri Muppin Kaadsiddheshwar (1905–2001) Maharaj met his Guru Shri Siddharameshwar Maharaj in 1935 and was with him for a period of about one year.
- Sri Ganapatrao Maharaj Kannur (1909–2004) was with him for 13 years.
- Shri Vilasanand Maharaj (1909–1993).
- Shri Ranachhodray Maharaj, Baitkhol Karwar.

== Publications ==
- Siddharameshwar Maharaj (1925), Golden Day (PDF)
- Nisargadatta Maharaj (1962), Adhyatma Dnyanacha Yogeshwar (Vol I & II). 130 talks of Siddharameshwar Maharaj, recorded by Shri Nisargadatta Maharaj in Marathi
- Siddharameshwar Maharaj (2008), Master Key to Self Realization, Sadguru Publishing
- Nisargadatta Maharaj (2009), Master of Self Realization. An Ultimate Understanding (Translation of "Adhyatma Dnyanacha Yogeshwar" (Vol I & II). Includes "Master Key to Self Realization", Sadguru Publishing
- Siddharameshwar Maharaj (2011), Amrut Laya: The Stateless State (Vol.I & II). Includes "Master Key to Self-Realization", Sadguru Publishing

=== Golden Day ===
Golden Day is a 10-page publication by Siddharameshwar Maharaj from 1925. (Note: It is available via siddharameshwar.org, Golden Day.)

=== Adhyatma Jnanachi Gurukilli - Master Key to Self-Realization ===
The most well known book in India containing Siddharameshwar Maharaj's teachings is Adhyatma Jnanachi Gurukilli. It was transcribed by Shri Dattatray Dharmayya Poredi, a distinguished disciple of Shri Siddharameshwar Maharajs, from Siddharameshwar's teachings as spoken in the Marathi language. It was originally published by Shri Ganapatrao Maharaj of Kannur.

Shri Ranjit Maharaj received verbal permission from Shri Ganapatrao Maharaj to have the text translated into English. Ranjit Maharaj entrusted the translation responsibilities to Dr. Mrs. Damyanti Dungaji. The completed English translation was then proofread and subsequently published by Shri Siddharameshwar Adhyatma Kendra, Mumbai under the name "Master Key to Self-Realization". When all of the copies of that original English text were sold, the text was incorporated into another book of Siddharameshwar Maharaj's talks entitled "Amrut Laya", also published by Shri Siddharameshwar Adhyatma Kendra, Mumbai). It was republished by Sadguru Publications in 2008, and also included within "Master of Self-Realization" and "Amrut Laya: The Stateless State".

=== Adhyatmadnyanacha Yogeshwar - Master of Self-Realization: An Ultimate Understanding ===
Adhyatmadnyanacha Yogeshwar Vol I & II consists of 130 talks of Sri Siddharameshwar Maharaj. They were transcribed, edited and published by Nisargadatta Maharaj in 1961-1962 in Marathi language, who also wrote the preface to the book. It was translated in English and published as "Master of Self-Realization: An Ultimate Understanding".

=== Amrut Laya: The Stateless State ===
Volume 1 of Amrut Laya is composed of transcribed notes from 50 talks given by Siddharameshwar Maharaj on various themes from Dasbodh. Volume 2 of Amrut Laya consists of notes taken from 88 talks of Siddharameshwar Maharaj where he elaborates on various spiritual principles from three main classic texts, namely Dasbodh, Yogavasishtha and Eknathi Bhagawat.

== Quotes of Siddharameshwar Maharaj ==
- "As is your concept, so will you see." - Dasbodh: Chapter 12, Subchapter 8, Verse 1
- "If you go beyond the source you will find that there exists nothing".
- "Spiritual science is the science where self is considered to first and foremost".
- "Mind is a collection of determinants and doubts".

== Sources ==
=== Published sources ===
- Boucher, Cathy (n.d.), The Lineage of Nine Gurus. The Navnath Sampradaya and Sri Nisargadatta Maharaj
- Frydman, Maurice (1987), Navanath Sampradaya. In: I Am That. Sri Nisargadatta Maharaj, Bombay: Chetana
- Jagadeesan, J. (2008), The Fourth Dimension, Sai Towers Publishing, ISBN 9788178990927
- Ranade, R.D. (1982), Mysticism In Maharashtra, Motilal Banarsidass Publishers (Pvt. Limited), ISBN 8120805755
- Ranade, R.D. (2003), Indian Mysticism, Munshiram Manoharlal Publishers Pvt. Limited, ISBN 8121510945
- Ranjit Maharaj (1999), Illusion vs. Reality: Dialogues with Shri Ranjit Maharaj on the "Stateless State, Sadguru Publishers
- Siddharameshwar Maharaj (2009), Master Key to Self-Realization. In: Master of Self-Realization. An Ultimate Understanding, Sadguru Publishing
