= Bhausaheb Maharaj =

Founder of Inchegeri Sampradaya (c. 1843–c. 1914)

- Shri Samartha Sadaguru Bhausaheb Maharaj

Personal life
- Born: Bhausaheb Umadikar; 1843 Karnataka
- Died: 1914 (aged 70–71)

Religious life
- Religion: Hinduism
- Founder of: Inchegeri Sampradaya
- Philosophy: Jnana yoga

Religious career
- Teacher: Nimbargi Maharaj

Bhausaheb Maharaj (c. 1843 - c. 1914) was the founder of the Inchegeri Sampradaya, to which the well-known Indian guru Nisargadatta Maharaj belonged.

== Biography ==
=== Background ===
Bhausaheb Maharaj was born in 1843 as Venkatesh Khanderao Deshpande. Bhausaheb Maharaj belonged to the Deshastha Brahmin caste.

=== Spiritual life ===
According to Kotnis, Bhausaheb Maharj was looked upon as the reincarnation of Sant Tukaram (1577–1650), a prominent Varkari Sant and spiritual poet of the Bhakti, who had taken birth again in the Neelwani Lingayat community to finish his work of spreading the knowledge of Self-realisation. He met his guru Sri Nimbargi at the age of fourteen. At the request of Nimbargi, Bhausaheb Maharaj Deshpande (1843 Umdi - 1914 Inchgiri) received mantra initiation from Shri Raghunathpriya Sadhu Maharaj, who was an ardent follower and a devoted disciple of Shri Gurulingajangam Maharaj. Bhausaheb Maharaj became a disciple of Nimbargi Maharaj.

== Teachings ==
=== The Ant's Way ===
Bhausaheb Maharaj's teachings, and those of his student Gurudeo Ranade, have been called Pipilika Marg , (Note: http://nondualite.free.fr, Shri Sadguru Siddharameshwar Maharaj) "the Ant's way", the way of meditation, while the teachings of his student Siddharameshwar Maharaj, and Siddharameshwar Maharaj's disciples Nisargadatta Maharaj and Ranjit Maharaj have been called Vihangam Marg, "the Bird's Way", the direct path to Self-discovery. (Note: The terms appear in the Varaha Upanishad, Chapter IV: "34. (The Rishi) Suka is a Mukta (emancipated person). (The Rishi) Vamadeva is a Mukta. There are no others (who have attained emancipation) than through these (viz., the two paths of these two Rishis). Those brave men who follow the path of Suka in this world become Sadyo-Muktas (viz., emancipated) immediately after (the body wear away); 35. While those who always follow the path of Vamadeva (i.e., Vedanta) in this world are subject again and again to rebirths and attain Krama (gradual) emancipation, through Yoga, Sankhya and Karmas associated with Sattva (Guna).; 36. Thus there are two paths laid down by the Lord of Devas (viz.,) the Suka and Vamadeva paths. The Suka path is called the bird’s path; while the Vamadeva path is called the ant’s path." (Note: swamji.com, Seven Bhumikas)) Ranjit Maharaj comments:

There are two ways to realize: the bird's way or ant's way. By meditation (or ant's way) one can realize. The word or name has so much power. The name you were given by your parents has done so many things. Mantra is given by the master, but it is a very long way for the understanding. By chanting or saying the mantra you can go to the final reality. There are only two things: one is reality, the other is illusion. One word only can wipe out illusion.

So one thought [i.e. mantra] from the Master who has realized is sufficient to realize. It is a very lengthy way, that's the only thing. So my Master found the shortest way, by thinking. By unthinking you have become the smallest creature, and by thinking you can become the greatest of the great, why not? If you don't have the capacity to understand by thinking, the bird's way, then you can go by way of meditation. It is the long way and you have to meditate for many hours a day. People say they meditate, but most don't know how to meditate. They say that God is one and myself is another one, that is the duality. It will never end that way.

So one word is sufficient from the Master. Words can cut words, thoughts can cut thoughts in a fraction of a second. It can take you beyond the words, that is yourself. In meditation you have to eventually submerge your ego, the meditator, and the action of the meditation, and finally yourself. It is a long way.

=== Nama-Yoga ===
Bhausaheb Maharaj's teachings were collected in a book called Nama-Yoga, a term coined by the compilers and translators of the book, whereas Bhausaheb Maharaj himself called it Jnana Marga, just like Nimbargi Maharaj did. The editors wrote:

"Nama-Yoga" is a word specially coined by us to designate the Spiritual Philosophy and Discipline of Sri [Bhausaheb] Maharaj. He himself called it Jnana-Marga - or Path of self-realisation. We have, however, used "Nama-Yoga" in a double sense. In fact, both the words - Nama and Yoga carry double meaning. Nama means i) Meditation on Divine Name and ii) Divinity in posse. Like many other saints, to Sri [Bhausaheb] Maharaj also, Nāma (name) and Rūpa (form) of God were identical. The Name itself was God. Yoga means Spiritual union or realisation of god. In the first sense, Nama-Yoga represents the Path, while in the second sense, it represents the Goal, as meditation, on Divine Name, if properly practiced, will lead to the realisation of the vision and bliss of the lord.

== Lineage ==
After his awakening he was authorized by Nimbargi to carry on the lineage, and established the Inchegeri Sampraday. Sri Bhausaheb Maharaj had many students, among which were:

- Sri Amburao Maharaj of Jigjivani (1857 Jigajevani - 1933 Inchgiri)
- Sri Gurudev Ranade of Nimbal (Note: Bridge-India, Shri Gurudev R.D. Ranade)
- Girimalleshwar Maharaj
- Sri Siddharameshwar Maharaj (1875-1936)

	Rishi Dattatreya (Note: Frydman 1987)								
Navnath, the nine founders of the Nath Sampradaya, (Note: Boucher) (Note: Frydman 1987)
	Gahininath, (Note: Dnyaneshwar) the 5th Navnath (Note: Frydman 1987)		Revananath, the 7th (Note: Frydman 1987) or 8th (Note: Boucher) Navnath, also known as Kada Siddha (Note: Kada Siddha (website Ranade Maharaj)					Siddhagiri Math (Note: Kada Siddha (website Ranade Maharaj)) (Note: Siddhagiri Math) c.q. Kaneri Math (est. 7th (Note: Siddhagiri Math (website Shri Kshetra Siddhagiri Math, Kaneri)) or 14th century (Note: Siddhagiri Math (Gramjivan Museum)); Lingayat Parampara (Note: Kaadsiddheshwar Maharaj (website Kaadsiddheshwar Maharaj)) c.q. Kaadasiddheshwar Parampara (Note: Kaadsiddheshwar Maharaj Parampara)	
	Nivruttinath, Dnyaneshwar's brother (Note: Dnyaneshwar)		Revananath, the 7th or 8th Navnath, also known as Kada Siddha					Siddhagiri Math c.q. Kaneri Math (est. 7th or 14th century; Lingayat Parampara c.q. Kaadasiddheshwar Parampara	
	Dnyaneshwar (Note: Nisargadatta Maharaj Disciples) (1275–1296) also known as Sant Jñāneshwar or Jñanadeva (Note: Nisargadatta Maharaj Disciples) and as Kadasiddha (Note: Frydman 1987) or Kad-Siddheshwar Maharaj (Note: Boucher)							Siddhagiri Math c.q. Kaneri Math (est. 7th or 14th century; Lingayat Parampara c.q. Kaadasiddheshwar Parampara	
Different accounts: Kadasiddha, (Note: Frydman 1987) also called "Almighty "Kadsiddeshwar", (Note: Ranjit Maharaj Timeline) who appeared as a vision to Sri Gurulingajangam Maharaj (Note: Ranjit Maharaj Timeline) or The 22nd or 24th (Note: Siddhagiri Math (website siddhagirimath.org)) Shri Samarth Muppin Kaadsiddheswar Maharaj, who initiated Sri Gurulingajangam Maharaj (Note: Siddhagiri Math (website siddhagirimath.org)) or "The 25th generation of the kadsiddha at siddhagiri had then initiated Guruling jangam maharaj of nimbargi." (Note: Kada Siddha (website Balkrushna Maharaj)) or "Juangam Maharaj" c.q. "a yogi [at Siddhagiri] who gave [Nimabargi Maharaj] a mantra and told him to meditate regularly on it" (Note: Boucher)
1	Nimbargi Maharaj (1789–1875) also known as Guru Lingam-Jangam Maharaj (Note: Boucher) (Note: Nimbargi Maharj (website Ranade Maharaj) (Note: Frydman 1987)							23rd Shri Samarth Muppin Kaadsiddheswar Maharaj	
2	Shri Bhausaheb Maharaj Umdikar (Note: Boucher) (Note: Bhausaheb Maharaj (website Ganapatrao Maharj)) (1843 Umdi – 1914 Inchgiri (Note: Bhausaheb Maharaj (website Ranade Maharaj)))							24th Shri Samarth Muppin Kaadsiddheswar Maharaj	
3	Shri Amburao Maharaj of Jigjivani (1857 Jigajevani – 1933 Inchgiri) (Note: Amburao Maharaj (website Ranade Maharaj)) (Note: Frydman 1987)	Shivalingavva Akka (1867–1930) (Note: Shivalingavva Akka (website Ranade Maharaj))	Girimalleshwar Maharaj (Note: Frydman 1987) (Note: Girimalleshwar Maharaj (website Balkrushnamauli Maharaj))			Sri Siddharameshwar Maharaj (1875–1936) (Note: Boucher) (Note: Frydman 1987)		25th Shri Samarth Muppin Kaadsiddheswar Maharaj	
4	Shri Gurudev Ranade of Nimbal (1886–1957) (Note: Amburao Maharaj Maharj (website Ranade Maharaj)) (Note: Ranade Maharaj (website Ranade Maharaj)) (Note: Boucher) (Note: Frydman 1987) (Note: Ranade Maharj (website Bridge-India))		Balkrishna Maharaj (Note: Balkrishna Maharaj (website Balkrishna Maharaj))	Shri Aujekar Laxman Maharaj (Note: Nagnath Alli Maharaj (website))	Madhavananda Prabhuji (d. 25th May, 1980) (Note: Madhavananda Prabhuji (website gurusfeet.com))	Sri Nisargadatta Maharaj (1897–1981) (Note: Boucher)	Sri Ranjit Maharaj (1913–2000) (Note: Boucher) (Note: Ranjit Maharaj (website Ranjit Maharaj)) (Note: Ranjit Maharaj Interview) (Note: Ranjit Maharaj Satsang); Sri Ganapatrao Maharaj Kannur (1909–2004) (Note: Bhausaheb Maharaj (website Ganapatrao Maharaj)); Shri Vilasanand Maharaj (1909–1993); Shri Ranachhodray Maharaj, Baitkhol Karwar	26th Shri Muppin Kaadsiddheshwar Maharaj (1905–2001) Student of Sri Siddharameshwar Maharaj (Note: Kaadsiddheshwar Maharaj (website Kaadsiddheshwar Maharaj))	
5	Shri Gurudev Chandra Bhanu Pathak (Note: Ranjit Maharaj (website Angelfire))		Bhausaheb Maharaj (Nandeshwar) (Note: Bhausaheb Maharaj (Nandeshwar) (website Balkrishna Maharaj))	Shri Nagnath Alli Maharaj (Note: Nagnath Alli Maharaj (website Nagnath Alli Maharaj))		Maurice Frydman (Note: Nisargadatta Maharaj Disciples); Ramesh Balsekar (Note: Nisargadatta Maharaj Disciples); Gautam Sachdeva (Note: Gautam Sachdeva); Ramakant Maharaj (Note: Ramakant Maharj (website Ramakant Maharaj)); Alexander Smit (Note: Nisargadatta Maharaj Disciples); Douwe Tiemersma (Note: Nisargadatta Maharaj Disciples); Robert Powell (Note: Nisargadatta Maharaj Disciples); Timothy Conway (Note: Nisargadatta Maharaj Disciples); Jean Dunn (Note: Nisargadatta Maharaj Disciples) (Note: Jean Dunn (website Ed Muzika)) (Note: Jean Dunn (website Ngeton)); Mark McCloskey (Note: Nisargadatta Maharaj Disciples); "Sailor" Bob Adamson (Note: Nisargadatta Maharaj Disciples) (Note: Sailor Bob Adamson (website Sailor Bob Adamson)); Stephen Wolinksky (Note: Nisargadatta Maharaj Disciples); Mark West (Note: Nisargadatta Maharaj Disciples); David Hargrove (Note: Nisargadatta Maharaj Disciples)		27th head: Adrushya Kadsiddheshwar Swamiji (Note: Siddhagiri Math – History (website siddhagirimath.org)	Jagadguru Ramanandacharya Shree Swami Narendracharyaji Maharaj (Note: Narendracharyaji Maharaj (website Narendracharyaji Maharaj))
Notes for table Notes Sources: Boucher, Cathy (2002), The Lineage of Nine Gurus. The Navnath Sampradaya and Sri Nisargadatta Maharaj; Frydman, Maurice (1987), Navanath Sampradaya. In: I Am That. Sri Nisargadatta Maharaj, Bombay: Chetana; Websites: Amburao Maharaj (website Ranade Maharaj): Gurudev R.D. Ranade, Sadguru Shri Amburao Maharaj Archived 2008-07-22 at the Wayback Machine; Balkrishna Maharaj (website Balkrishna Maharaj): balkrushnamauli.com, Samarth Sadguru Balkrushna Maharaj; Bhausaheb Maharaj (website Ranade Maharaj): Gurudev R.D. Ranade, Sadguru Shri Bhausaheb Maharaj Umdikar; Bhausaheb Maharaj (website Ganapatrao Maharaj): ShantiKuteer Ashram, Bhausaheb Maharaj; Bhausaheb Maharaj (Nandeshwar) (website Balkrishna Maharaj): balkrushnamauli.com, Shri Bhausaheb Maharaj (Nandeshwar); Dnyaneshwar: V. V. Shirvaikar, A brief biography of saint Dnyaneshwar (Jnanadeva); Gautam Sachdeva: gautamsachdeva.com, About Gautam Sachdeva; Girimalleshwar Maharaj (website Balkrushnamauli Maharaj): balkrushnamauli.com, Girimalleshwar Maharaj; Jean Dunn (website Ed Muzika): Jean Dunn and Nisargadatta Maharaj; Jean Dunn (website Ngeton): Ngeton, Navnath Masters; Kaadsiddheshwar Maharaj (website Kaadsiddheshwar Maharaj): Mazad Sad Guru, Biography; Kaadsiddheshwar Maharaj Parampara: mazasadguru.com, The Kaadsiddheshwar Parampara; Kada Siddha (website Ranade Maharaj): Gurudev R.D. Ranade, Kada Siddha; Kada Siddha (website Balkrushna Maharaj): Balkrushna Maharaj, Kadsiddheshwar Maharaj; Madhavananda Prabhuji (website gurusfeet.com)Gurus Feet, Madhavananda Prabhuji; Nagnath Alli Maharaj (website Nagnath Alli Maharaj): Shri S.S. Nagnath Alli Maharaj Sansthan, About us; Narendracharyaji Maharaj (website Narendracharyaji Maharaj): A brief biography of Jagadguru Ramanandacharya Sri Swami Narendracharyaji Maharaj; Nimbargi Maharaj (website Ranade Maharaj): Gurudev R.D. Ranade, Sadguru Shri Guruling Jangam Maharaj; Nisargadatta Maharaj Commemorations pt.1: David Godman, Remembering Nisargadatta Maharaj pt.1; Nisargadatta Maharaj Disciples: Advaita Vision, Navnath Sampradaya. Disciples of Nisargadatta Maharaj; Ramakant Maharaj (website Ramakant Maharaj): Shri Ramakant Maharaj, Information; Ranade Maharaj (website Ranade Maharaj): Gurudev R.D. Ranade, Shri Gurudev R. D. Ranade; Ranade Maharaj (website Bridge-India): Bridge-India, Shri Gurudev R.D. Ranade; Ranjit Maharaj (website Ranjit Maharaj): Sadguru.com, Shri Ranjit Maharaj; Ranjit Maharaj Timeline: Sadguru.com, Shri Ranjit Maharaj History; Ranjit Maharaj Interview: InnerQuest, Ranjit interview; Ranjit Maharaj Satsang: inner-quest.org, "Final Reality has no beginning and no end."; Ranjit Maharaj (website Angelfire): Sri Ranjit Maharaj profile; Sailor Bob Adamson (website Sailor Bob Adamson): Sailor Bob Adamson website; Shivalingavva Akka (website Ranade Maharaj): gurudevranade.com, Rv. Smt.Shri.Shivalingavva Akka; Siddhagiri Math: Detailed history of Shri Nisarghadatta Maharaj; Siddhagiri Math (website Shri Kshetra Siddhagiri Math, Kaneri): Shri Kshetra Siddhagiri Math, Kaneri; Siddhagiri Math (Gramjivan Museum): Siddhagiri Gramjivan Museum Kaneri Math; Siddhagiri Math (website siddhagirimath.org): siddhagirimath.org, Siddhagiri Math – Pedigree; Siddhagiri Math – History (website siddhagirimath.org): siddhagirimath.org, Siddhagiri Math – History

== See also ==
- Advaita Vedanta

== Sources ==
=== Published sources ===
- Bokil, Vinayak Pandurang (1979), Rajguru Ramdas, Kamalesh P. Bokil : sole distributors, International Book Service
- Boucher, Cathy (n.d.), The Lineage of Nine Gurus. The Navnath Sampradaya and Sri Nisargadatta Maharaj
- Dabade, K.D. (1998), Sociology of religion: a case study of Nimbargi Sampradaya, Mangala Publications
- Frydman, Maurice (1987), Navanath Sampradaya. In: I Am That. Sri Nisargadatta Maharaj, Bombay: Chetana
- Kher, Appaji Kashinath (1895), A higher Anglo-Marathi grammar, pp. 446–454
- Kotnis, Anant Narsinha (1963), Life sketch of Sant Tatyasaheb Kotnis
- Nisargadatta (1973), I Am That (PDF), archived from the original (PDF) on 27 January 2018
- Ranjit Maharaj (1999). Illusion vs. Reality: Dialogues with Shri Ranjit Maharaj on the "Stateless State. Sadguru Publishers.
