= Inchagiri Sampradaya =

Lineage of Hindu Navnath

Shri Samartha Sadaguru Bhausaheb Maharaj

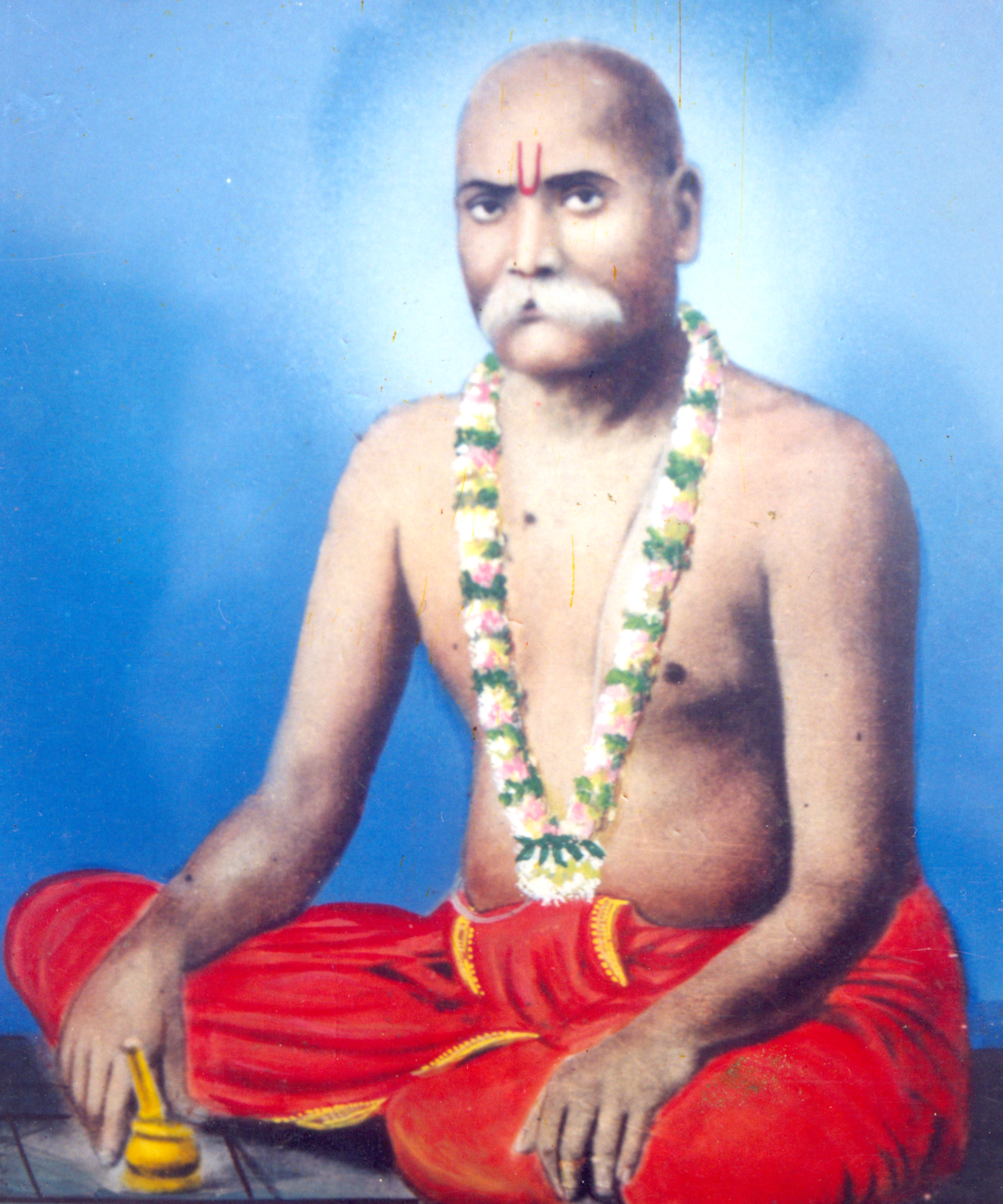
Shri Samartha Sadguru Ramachandrarao Maharaj Kupakaddi

Shri Samartha Sadaguru Siddharameshwar Maharaj

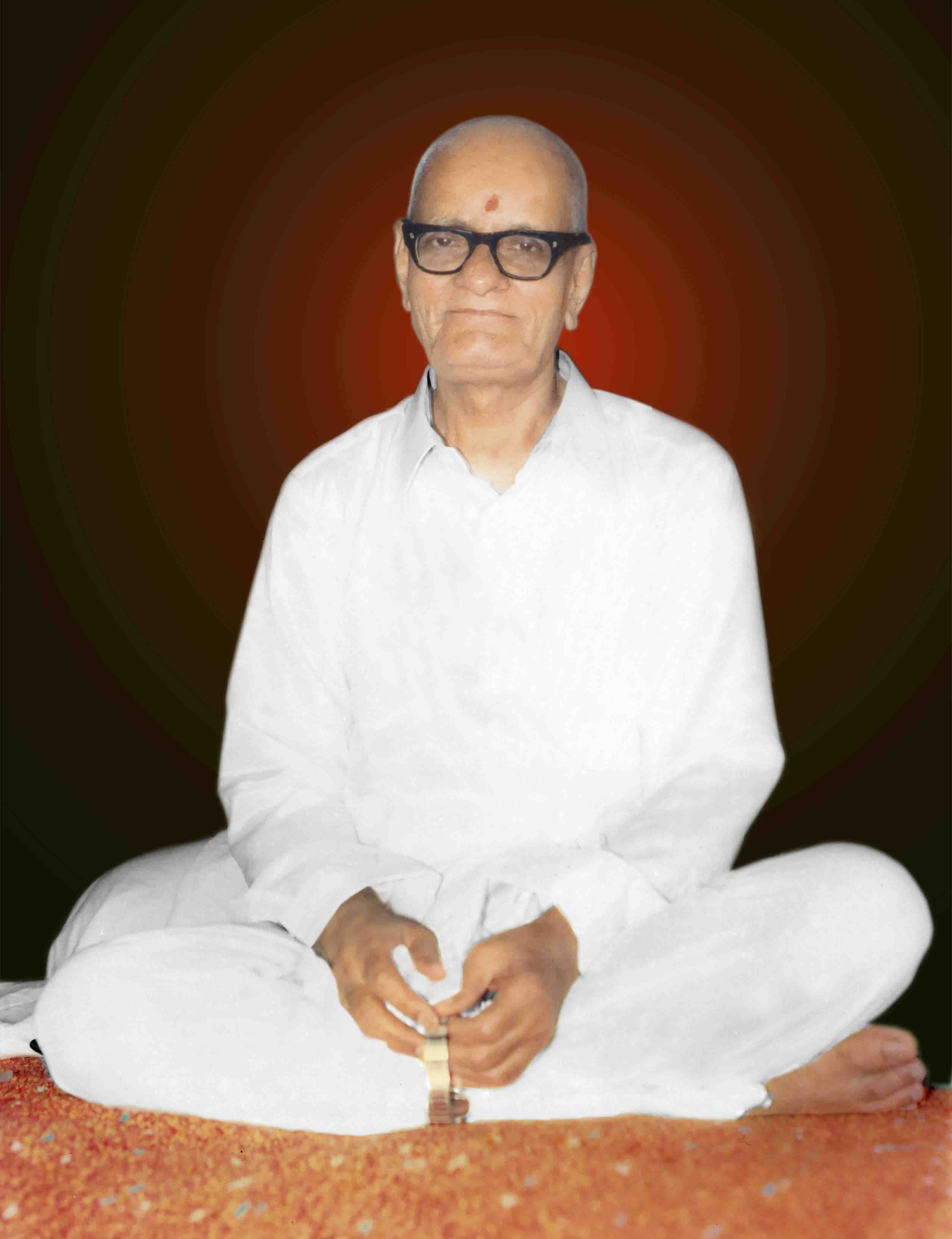
Sri Samartha Sadaguru Ganapatrao Maharaj Kannur

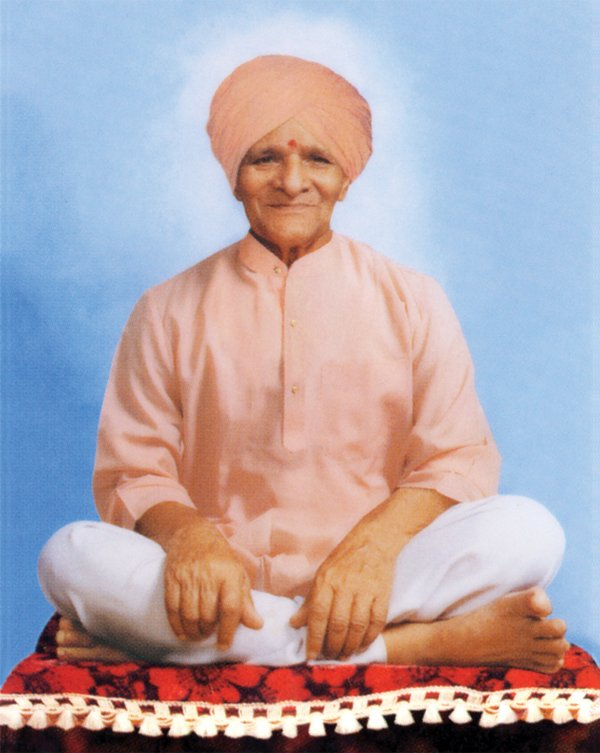
Shri Smarth Sadguru Muppin Kadsiddheshwar Maharaj

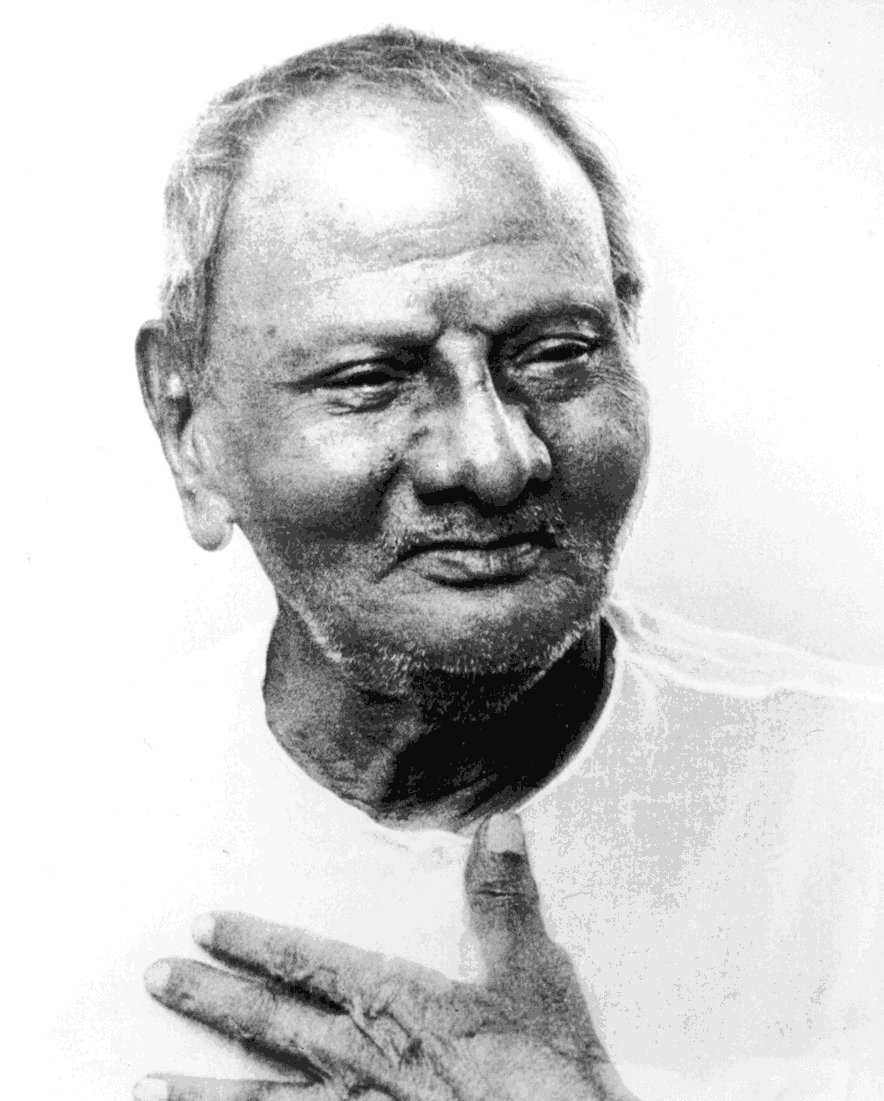
Nisargadatta Maharaj

The Inchagiri Sampradaya, also known as Nimbargi Sampradaya, is a lineage of Hindu Navnath and Lingayat teachers from Maharashtra and Karnataka, which was started by Bhausaheb Maharaj. It is inspired by Sant Mat teachers as Namdev, Raidas and Kabir. The Inchagiri Sampradaya has become well known throughout the western world due to the popularity of Nisargadatta Maharaj.

== History ==
=== Navnath ===
==== Dattatreya ====
The mythological origins of the Inchagiri Sampradaya are ascribed to Dattatreya. He initiated the Navanaths, the Holy Nine Gurus, and the Navanath Sampraday. (Note: Navnath Sampradaya)

==== Revananath – Siddhagiri Math (Kaneri Math) ====
One of those Navnaths was Revanath, the 7th or 8th Navnath. Revanath settled on the Siddhgiri hill for ascetic practice, living on whatever the jungle, gave him. He became famous as Kaadhsiddheshwar, (Note: "Kaadh" = jungle; * "siddh" = siddha, siddha guru, "one who is accomplished"; * "eshwar" = Shiva, the "Supreme lord over other Gods".) "the one who attained supreme realization in a forest".

Revananath is considered to have established the Kaadsiddheshwar temple and math, also called Kaadsiddheshwar Peeth. (Note: mazasadguru.com, The Kaadsiddheshwar Parampara) in the 7th century CE. Other accounts mention a history of "more than 1300 years", (Note: siddhagirimath.org, Siddhagiri Math – History) and the 14th century CE, when a Lingayat Priest established a Shivling at the hill, which became Kaneri Math, nowadays called Siddhagiri Math, (Note: Siddhagiri Gramjivan Museum Kaneri Math) (Note: Kaneri Math Kolhapur) It is located on Siddhagiri hill in Kanheri village, Karveer tehsil, Kolhapur district, Maharashtra state, India.

The Siddhagiri Math was established around the Moola-Kaadsiddheswar Shiva temple in the Shaiva-Lingayat tradition. It is a vast campus with the central Shiva temple.

In the 12th century the Math came under the influence of Basaveshwar, who established the Lingayat tradition of south India. It is the main Kuldaivat (Note: "Dynastic Gods/Teachers")) of the Lingayat Shaiva community, its influence exceeding to most of the districts of Maharashtra and Karnataka, and also to some places in Madhya Pradesh and Andhra Pradesh.

Part of Siddhagiri Math is the "Siddhagiri Gramjivan Museum", a wax museum dedicated to Gandhi's ideal of rural life. It was established by the 27th Mathadhipati, Adrushya Kadsiddheshwar Swami Ji.

=== Dnyaneshwar ===
Revanath initiated Sant Dnyaneshwar (Note: Advaita Vision, Navnath Sampradaya. Disciples of Nisargadatta Maharaj) (1275–1296), also known as Sant Jñāneshwar or Jñanadeva and as Kadasiddha or Kad-Siddheshwar Maharaj.

Dnyaneshwar was a 13th-century Maharashtrian Hindu saint (Sant – a title by which he is often referred), poet, philosopher and yogi of the Nath tradition whose works Bhavartha Deepika (a commentary on Bhagavad Gita, popularly known as "Dnyaneshwari"), and Amrutanubhav are considered to be milestones in Marathi literature.

According to Shirvaikar, Dnyaneshwar was initiated into the Nath by his elder brother Nivrutti, who was born in 1273. (Note: V. V. Shirvaikar, A brief biography of saint Dnyaneshwar (Jnanadeva))

In a state of extreme distress Vithalpant went to Triambakeshwar (near Nasik) with his family for performing worship at the Shiva temple. Triambakeshwar is one of the twelve Jyotirlingas or luminary lingas of Lord Shiva. While they had gone for performing pradakshina (circumambulation) of the temple one night they encountered a ferocious tiger (in thirteenth century the area was a deep forest) The members of the family ran helter skelter and were dispersed. Nivrutti wandered into a cave in the Anjani mountain where Gahininath, one of the nine Naths was staying for some time. He was attracted towards Nivrutti and in spite of his young age initiated him into Nath sect by initiation of nath panthi 'soham sadhana' which is combination of yoga, bhakti and also dnyana, instructing him to propagate devotion to Shri Krishna. That is how Nivrutti became Nivruttinath. The matter of excommunication did not affect this because the Nath sect does not bother about caste system and though socially it may be observed it is ignored in spiritual matters.

In 1287 Nivrutti initiated his younger brother:

Nivrutinath initiated Dnyanadeo into the Nath sect and instructed him to write a commentary on Gita. Thus we have a unique situation of a fourteen-year-old Guru instructing his twelve-year-old disciple to write something which has become the hope of humanity.

Dnyaneshwar died at the young age of 21.

=== Nimbargi Maharaj (Gurulingajangam Maharaj) – Nimbargi Sampradaya ===
Different accounts of the founding of the Nimbargi Sampradaya by Nimbargi Maharaj, the alternate name of the Inchegeri Sampradaya, are to be found.

- According to several accounts, in 1820 (Note: Sadguru Shri Ranjit Maharaj, History) Kadasiddha, or "Almighty "Kadsiddeshwar", appeared as a vision to Sri Gurulingajangam Maharaj" (1789-1875), also known as "Nimbargi Maharaj".
- According to a different account, the 22nd or 24th (Note: siddhagirimath.org, "pedigree") Shri Samarth Muppin Kaadsiddheswar Maharaj (Note: In the Kaadasiddheshwar Sampradaya) initiated Nimbargi Maharaj. (Note: balkrushnamauli.com, Guruling Jangam Maharaj)
- According to Frydman, Kadasiddha initiated both Lingajangam Maharaj and Bhausahib Maharaj, and "entrusted to their care his Ashram". (Note: How Gurulingajangam Maharaj and Bhausahib Maharaj were initiated is not being narrated, but given the span of time between the 13th century and the 19th century and the early dismiss of Dnyaneshwar, a physical initiation seems unlikely.) (Note: Bhausahib Maharaj was born in 1843.)
- According to Cathy Boucher, Nimbargi Maharaj's guru was called "Guru Juangam Maharaj". She also mentions "a yogi [at Siddhagiri] who gave [Nimabargi Maharaj] a mantra and told him to meditate regularly on it".

Nimbargi belonged to a Nellawai sub-caste of the Lingayat caste. According to Boucher,

It is significant that some of the founders of the Navnath Sampradaya are Lingayat or Virasaiva because this was a revolutionary movement, allowing people of all walks of life, and both sexes to find Shiva immanent within themselves. Part of this democratizing movement, I believe, is a reaction of Western India's contact with Islam, which embraces people of all class, creed and gender. The iconoclasm, which is at the heart of Virasaivism actually comes down to us in the twentieth and twenty-first centuries as something we can easily relate to. The breaking down of taboos, of certain parts of India's spiritual structure makes it possible for us as modern people to partake of these teachings. We do not even have to be practicing Hindus, in the traditional sense, in order to hear it. This attitude was most evident in the Satsang room of Sri Nisargaddatta Maharaj.

Nimbargi practiced for 36 years, meanwhile living as a householder, and was finally awakened when he was 67. Until his death, at the age of 95, he "initiated people and lived the life of a Jivanmukta".

=== Bhausaheb Maharaj – Inchagiri Sampradaya ===
According to Kotnis, Bhausaheb Maharaj was looked upon as the reincarnation of Sant Tukaram (1577–1650), a prominent Varkari Sant and spiritual poet of the Bhakti, who had taken birth again in the Neelwani Lingayat community to finish his work of spreading the knowledge of Self-realization. Bhausaheb Maharaj belonged to the Deshastha Brahmin caste. the same caste to which the thirteenth century Varkari saint and philosopher Dnyaneshwar belonged, the 16th century sant Eknath, and the 17th century saint and spiritual poet Samarth Ramdas.

At the request of Nimbargi, Bhausaheb Maharaj Deshpande (1843 Umdi – 1914 Inchgiri) received mantra initiation from Shri Raghunathpriya Sadhu Maharaj, who was an ardent follower and a devoted disciple of Shri Gurulingajangam Maharaj. Bhausaheb Maharaj became a disciple of Nimbargi Maharaj.

Bhausaheb Maharaj teachings were collected in a book called Nama-Yoga, a term coined by the compilers and translators of the book, whereas Bhausaheb Maharaj himself called it Jnana Marga, just like Nimbargi Maharaj did. Bhausaheb Maharaj's teachings, and those of his student Gurudeo Ranade, have been called Pipilika Marg , (Note: http://nondualite.free.fr, Shri Sadguru Siddharameshwar Maharaj) "the Ant's way", the way of meditation, (Note: sadguru.us, The Bird's way) while the teachings of Siddharameshwar Maharaj and his disciples Nisargadatta Maharaj and Ranjit Maharaj have been called Vihangam Marg, "the Bird's Way", the direct path to Self-discovery. (Note: sadguru.us: "The way of meditation is a long arduous path while the Bird's Way is a clear direct path of Self investigation, Self exploration, and using thought or concepts as an aid to understanding and Self-Realization. Sometimes this approach is also called the Reverse Path. What Reverse Path indicates is the turning around of one's attention away from objectivity to the more subjective sense of one's Beingness. (Compare Jinul's "tracing back the radiance": Buswell, Robert E. (1991), Tracing Back the Radiance: Chinul's Korean Way of Zen, University of Hawaii Press, ISBN 978-0-8248-1427-4). With the Bird's Way, first one's mind must be made subtle. This is generally done with some initial meditation on a mantra or phrase which helps the aspirant to step beyond the mental/conceptual body, using a concept to go beyond conceptualization.") (Note: The terms appear in the Varaha Upanishad, Chapter IV: "34. (The Rishi) Suka is a Mukta (emancipated person). (The Rishi) Vamadeva is a Mukta. There are no others (who have attained emancipation) than through these (viz., the two paths of these two Rishis). Those brave men who follow the path of Suka in this world become Sadyo-Muktas (viz., emancipated) immediately after (the body wear away); 35. While those who always follow the path of Vamadeva (i.e., Vedanta) in this world are subject again and again to rebirths and attain Krama (gradual) emancipation, through Yoga, Sankhya and Karmas associated with Sattva (Guna).; 36. Thus there are two paths laid down by the Lord of Devas (viz.,) the Suka and Vamadeva paths. The Suka path is called the bird's path; while the Vamadeva path is called the ant's path." (Note: swamji.com, Seven Bhumikas))

After his awakening he was authorized by Nimbargi to carry on the lineage, and established the Inchegeri Sampraday. Sri Bhausaheb Maharaj had many students, among which were:

- Sri Amburao Maharaj of Jigjivani (1857 Jigajevani – 1933 Inchgiri)
- Sri Ramachandrarao Maharaj (1873 Horti – 1937 Kupakaddi) (Note: Shri Sadguru Ramachandrarao Maharaj)
- Sri Gurudev Ranade of Nimbal (Note: Bridge-India, Shri Gurudev R.D. Ranade)
- Girimalleshwar Maharaj
- Sri Siddharameshwar Maharaj (1875–1936)

==== R.D. Ranade ====
Ramachandra Dattatreya Ranade (1886–1957) was a scholar with an academic career. He taught at Willindon College, Sangli, on a regular basis before being invited to join Allahabad University as Head of Department of Philosophy where he rose to be the Vice-Chancellor. After retirement in 1946 he lived in an ashrama in a small village, Nimbal, near Solapur where he died on 6 June 1957.

==== Siddharameshwar Maharaj ====
Siddharameshwar Maharaj was born in 1888. In 1906 he was initiated by his guru Bhausaheb Maharaj in Inchegeri in Bijapur district, Karnataka India, who taught mantra-meditation as the way to reach Final Reality. In 1920 Siddharameshwar Maharaj started to set out on "the Bird's Path", the fast way to attain realisation, six years after Bhauhaseb maharaj had died. His fellow-students opposed, but eventually he succeeded by himself.

Sri Siddharameshwar Maharaj initiated several well-known teachers:

- Sri Ranjit Maharaj; (Note: Ranjit interview)
- Sri Nisargadatta Maharaj (1897–1981), who was with him for about two and a half years, 1933–1936;

Siddharameshwar Maharaje used four books to give sermons on: Dasbodh of Saint Shri Samarth Ramdas; the Yoga Vasistha; "Sadachara" of Shri Shankaracharya; and the "Eknathi Bhagwat" of Sant Eknath.

===== Nisargadatta Maharaj =====
Nisargadatta started to give initiations in 1951, after a personal revelation from his guru, Siddharameshwar Maharaj: (Note: Nisargadatta Maharaj Biography enlightened-spirituality.org)

Ever since his return to Bombay in 1938, Nisargadatta had been sought out by those desiring his counsel on spiritual matters. Many wanted to become his disciples and get formal mantra-initiation from him, reverentially calling him "Maharaj," "Great (Spiritual) King." Yet he was reluctant to have disciples and serve as a guru. Finally, in 1951, after receiving an inner revelation from Siddharamesvar, he began to initiate students into discipleship.

Nisargadatta Maharaj attracted a broad following in the western world. He never appointed any successor, because

[...] he wasn't allowed to appoint a successor. You have to remember that Nisargadatta wasn't realized himself when Siddharameshwar passed away. (Note: David Godman, Remembering Nisargadatta Maharaj pt.1)

Only a few persons were acknowledged as jnani by Sri Nisargadatta. (Note: David Godman mentions Maurice Frydman and a Canadian called "Rudi".) Nevertheless, several western teachers regard Sri Nisargadatta to be their guru. (Note: nisargadatta.org, Navnath Sampradaya) Shri Ramakant Maharaj says to be "the only Indian direct disciple of Shri Nisargadatta Maharaj" who offers initiation into this lineage. (Note: Shri Ramakant Maharaj, Information) He received the Naam mantra in 1962 from Shri Nisargadatta Maharaj, and spent the next 19 years with him. (Note: Shri Ramakant Maharaj)

===== Ranjit Maharaj =====
Sri Ranjit Maharaj (1913–2000) met Siddharameshwar Maharaj in 1924. The following year he was initiated by Siddharameshwar Maharaj. In 1934, at the age of 24, he took initiation to monkhood. Only in 1983, at the age of 70, initiated his first disciple, Shri Siddharameshwar Maharajs granddaughter in law. (Note: sadguru.com, Shree Ranjit Maharj)

===== Ganapatrao Maharaj Kannur =====
Shri Samartha Sadaguru Ganapatrao Maharaj Kannur (1909–2004) was initiated by Siddharameshwar Maharaj when he was thirteen. After graduation he attained liberation at age 24. Later in life he founded the Shanti Kuteer Ashram.

===== Shri Muppin Kaadsiddheshwar Maharaj =====
Shri Muppin Kaadsiddheshwar Maharaj was formally adopted by the 25th Virupaksha Kaadeshwar of the Kaneri Math, Lingayat Parampara, and invested as the 26th Mathadheepati of the (Siddhagiri) Kaneri Math, Lingayat Parampara, in 1922 at the age of 17. (Note: mazasadguru.com, Biography) He met Siddharameshwar Maharaj in 1935, who became his guru.

== Lineage and succession ==
Inchegeri Sampradaya

	Rishi Dattatreya (Note: Frydman 1987)								
Navnath, the nine founders of the Nath Sampradaya, (Note: Boucher) (Note: Frydman 1987)
	Gahininath, (Note: Dnyaneshwar) the 5th Navnath (Note: Frydman 1987)		Revananath, the 7th (Note: Frydman 1987) or 8th (Note: Boucher) Navnath, also known as Kada Siddha (Note: Kada Siddha (website Ranade Maharaj)					Siddhagiri Math (Note: Kada Siddha (website Ranade Maharaj)) (Note: Siddhagiri Math) c.q. Kaneri Math (est. 7th (Note: Siddhagiri Math (website Shri Kshetra Siddhagiri Math, Kaneri)) or 14th century (Note: Siddhagiri Math (Gramjivan Museum)); Lingayat Parampara (Note: Kaadsiddheshwar Maharaj (website Kaadsiddheshwar Maharaj)) c.q. Kaadasiddheshwar Parampara (Note: Kaadsiddheshwar Maharaj Parampara)	
	Nivruttinath, Dnyaneshwar's brother (Note: Dnyaneshwar)		Revananath, the 7th or 8th Navnath, also known as Kada Siddha					Siddhagiri Math c.q. Kaneri Math (est. 7th or 14th century; Lingayat Parampara c.q. Kaadasiddheshwar Parampara	
	Dnyaneshwar (Note: Nisargadatta Maharaj Disciples) (1275–1296) also known as Sant Jñāneshwar or Jñanadeva (Note: Nisargadatta Maharaj Disciples) and as Kadasiddha (Note: Frydman 1987) or Kad-Siddheshwar Maharaj (Note: Boucher)							Siddhagiri Math c.q. Kaneri Math (est. 7th or 14th century; Lingayat Parampara c.q. Kaadasiddheshwar Parampara	
Different accounts: Kadasiddha, (Note: Frydman 1987) also called "Almighty "Kadsiddeshwar", (Note: Ranjit Maharaj Timeline) who appeared as a vision to Sri Gurulingajangam Maharaj (Note: Ranjit Maharaj Timeline) or The 22nd or 24th (Note: Siddhagiri Math (website siddhagirimath.org)) Shri Samarth Muppin Kaadsiddheswar Maharaj, who initiated Sri Gurulingajangam Maharaj (Note: Siddhagiri Math (website siddhagirimath.org)) or "The 25th generation of the kadsiddha at siddhagiri had then initiated Guruling jangam maharaj of nimbargi." (Note: Kada Siddha (website Balkrushna Maharaj)) or "Juangam Maharaj" c.q. "a yogi [at Siddhagiri] who gave [Nimabargi Maharaj] a mantra and told him to meditate regularly on it" (Note: Boucher)
1	Nimbargi Maharaj (1789–1875) also known as Guru Lingam-Jangam Maharaj (Note: Boucher) (Note: Nimbargi Maharj (website Ranade Maharaj) (Note: Frydman 1987)							23rd Shri Samarth Muppin Kaadsiddheswar Maharaj	
2	Shri Bhausaheb Maharaj Umdikar (Note: Boucher) (Note: Bhausaheb Maharaj (website Ganapatrao Maharj)) (1843 Umdi – 1914 Inchgiri (Note: Bhausaheb Maharaj (website Ranade Maharaj)))							24th Shri Samarth Muppin Kaadsiddheswar Maharaj	
3	Shri Amburao Maharaj of Jigjivani (1857 Jigajevani – 1933 Inchgiri) (Note: Amburao Maharaj (website Ranade Maharaj)) (Note: Frydman 1987)	Shivalingavva Akka (1867–1930) (Note: Shivalingavva Akka (website Ranade Maharaj))	Girimalleshwar Maharaj (Note: Frydman 1987) (Note: Girimalleshwar Maharaj (website Balkrushnamauli Maharaj))			Sri Siddharameshwar Maharaj (1875–1936) (Note: Boucher) (Note: Frydman 1987)		25th Shri Samarth Muppin Kaadsiddheswar Maharaj	
4	Shri Gurudev Ranade of Nimbal (1886–1957) (Note: Amburao Maharaj Maharj (website Ranade Maharaj)) (Note: Ranade Maharaj (website Ranade Maharaj)) (Note: Boucher) (Note: Frydman 1987) (Note: Ranade Maharj (website Bridge-India))		Balkrishna Maharaj (Note: Balkrishna Maharaj (website Balkrishna Maharaj))	Shri Aujekar Laxman Maharaj (Note: Nagnath Alli Maharaj (website))	Madhavananda Prabhuji (d. 25th May, 1980) (Note: Madhavananda Prabhuji (website gurusfeet.com))	Sri Nisargadatta Maharaj (1897–1981) (Note: Boucher)	Sri Ranjit Maharaj (1913–2000) (Note: Boucher) (Note: Ranjit Maharaj (website Ranjit Maharaj)) (Note: Ranjit Maharaj Interview) (Note: Ranjit Maharaj Satsang); Sri Ganapatrao Maharaj Kannur (1909–2004) (Note: Bhausaheb Maharaj (website Ganapatrao Maharaj)); Shri Vilasanand Maharaj (1909–1993); Shri Ranachhodray Maharaj, Baitkhol Karwar	26th Shri Muppin Kaadsiddheshwar Maharaj (1905–2001) Student of Sri Siddharameshwar Maharaj (Note: Kaadsiddheshwar Maharaj (website Kaadsiddheshwar Maharaj))	
5	Shri Gurudev Chandra Bhanu Pathak (Note: Ranjit Maharaj (website Angelfire))		Bhausaheb Maharaj (Nandeshwar) (Note: Bhausaheb Maharaj (Nandeshwar) (website Balkrishna Maharaj))	Shri Nagnath Alli Maharaj (Note: Nagnath Alli Maharaj (website Nagnath Alli Maharaj))		Maurice Frydman (Note: Nisargadatta Maharaj Disciples); Ramesh Balsekar (Note: Nisargadatta Maharaj Disciples); Gautam Sachdeva (Note: Gautam Sachdeva); Ramakant Maharaj (Note: Ramakant Maharj (website Ramakant Maharaj)); Alexander Smit (Note: Nisargadatta Maharaj Disciples); Douwe Tiemersma (Note: Nisargadatta Maharaj Disciples); Robert Powell (Note: Nisargadatta Maharaj Disciples); Timothy Conway (Note: Nisargadatta Maharaj Disciples); Jean Dunn (Note: Nisargadatta Maharaj Disciples) (Note: Jean Dunn (website Ed Muzika)) (Note: Jean Dunn (website Ngeton)); Mark McCloskey (Note: Nisargadatta Maharaj Disciples); "Sailor" Bob Adamson (Note: Nisargadatta Maharaj Disciples) (Note: Sailor Bob Adamson (website Sailor Bob Adamson)); Stephen Wolinksky (Note: Nisargadatta Maharaj Disciples); Mark West (Note: Nisargadatta Maharaj Disciples); David Hargrove (Note: Nisargadatta Maharaj Disciples)		27th head: Adrushya Kadsiddheshwar Swamiji (Note: Siddhagiri Math – History (website siddhagirimath.org)	Jagadguru Ramanandacharya Shree Swami Narendracharyaji Maharaj (Note: Narendracharyaji Maharaj (website Narendracharyaji Maharaj))
Notes for table Notes Sources: Boucher, Cathy (2002), The Lineage of Nine Gurus. The Navnath Sampradaya and Sri Nisargadatta Maharaj; Frydman, Maurice (1987), Navanath Sampradaya. In: I Am That. Sri Nisargadatta Maharaj, Bombay: Chetana; Websites: Amburao Maharaj (website Ranade Maharaj): Gurudev R.D. Ranade, Sadguru Shri Amburao Maharaj Archived 2008-07-22 at the Wayback Machine; Balkrishna Maharaj (website Balkrishna Maharaj): balkrushnamauli.com, Samarth Sadguru Balkrushna Maharaj; Bhausaheb Maharaj (website Ranade Maharaj): Gurudev R.D. Ranade, Sadguru Shri Bhausaheb Maharaj Umdikar; Bhausaheb Maharaj (website Ganapatrao Maharaj): ShantiKuteer Ashram, Bhausaheb Maharaj; Bhausaheb Maharaj (Nandeshwar) (website Balkrishna Maharaj): balkrushnamauli.com, Shri Bhausaheb Maharaj (Nandeshwar); Dnyaneshwar: V. V. Shirvaikar, A brief biography of saint Dnyaneshwar (Jnanadeva); Gautam Sachdeva: gautamsachdeva.com, About Gautam Sachdeva; Girimalleshwar Maharaj (website Balkrushnamauli Maharaj): balkrushnamauli.com, Girimalleshwar Maharaj; Jean Dunn (website Ed Muzika): Jean Dunn and Nisargadatta Maharaj; Jean Dunn (website Ngeton): Ngeton, Navnath Masters; Kaadsiddheshwar Maharaj (website Kaadsiddheshwar Maharaj): Mazad Sad Guru, Biography; Kaadsiddheshwar Maharaj Parampara: mazasadguru.com, The Kaadsiddheshwar Parampara; Kada Siddha (website Ranade Maharaj): Gurudev R.D. Ranade, Kada Siddha; Kada Siddha (website Balkrushna Maharaj): Balkrushna Maharaj, Kadsiddheshwar Maharaj; Madhavananda Prabhuji (website gurusfeet.com)Gurus Feet, Madhavananda Prabhuji; Nagnath Alli Maharaj (website Nagnath Alli Maharaj): Shri S.S. Nagnath Alli Maharaj Sansthan, About us; Narendracharyaji Maharaj (website Narendracharyaji Maharaj): A brief biography of Jagadguru Ramanandacharya Sri Swami Narendracharyaji Maharaj; Nimbargi Maharaj (website Ranade Maharaj): Gurudev R.D. Ranade, Sadguru Shri Guruling Jangam Maharaj; Nisargadatta Maharaj Commemorations pt.1: David Godman, Remembering Nisargadatta Maharaj pt.1; Nisargadatta Maharaj Disciples: Advaita Vision, Navnath Sampradaya. Disciples of Nisargadatta Maharaj; Ramakant Maharaj (website Ramakant Maharaj): Shri Ramakant Maharaj, Information; Ranade Maharaj (website Ranade Maharaj): Gurudev R.D. Ranade, Shri Gurudev R. D. Ranade; Ranade Maharaj (website Bridge-India): Bridge-India, Shri Gurudev R.D. Ranade; Ranjit Maharaj (website Ranjit Maharaj): Sadguru.com, Shri Ranjit Maharaj; Ranjit Maharaj Timeline: Sadguru.com, Shri Ranjit Maharaj History; Ranjit Maharaj Interview: InnerQuest, Ranjit interview; Ranjit Maharaj Satsang: inner-quest.org, "Final Reality has no beginning and no end."; Ranjit Maharaj (website Angelfire): Sri Ranjit Maharaj profile; Sailor Bob Adamson (website Sailor Bob Adamson): Sailor Bob Adamson website; Shivalingavva Akka (website Ranade Maharaj): gurudevranade.com, Rv. Smt.Shri.Shivalingavva Akka; Siddhagiri Math: Detailed history of Shri Nisarghadatta Maharaj; Siddhagiri Math (website Shri Kshetra Siddhagiri Math, Kaneri): Shri Kshetra Siddhagiri Math, Kaneri; Siddhagiri Math (Gramjivan Museum): Siddhagiri Gramjivan Museum Kaneri Math; Siddhagiri Math (website siddhagirimath.org): siddhagirimath.org, Siddhagiri Math – Pedigree; Siddhagiri Math – History (website siddhagirimath.org): siddhagirimath.org, Siddhagiri Math – History

Nisargadatta narrates the following about the succession of teachers of the Inchagiri Sampradaya:

I sit here every day answering your questions, but this is not the way that the teachers of my lineage used to do their work. A few hundred years ago there were no questions and answers at all. Ours is a householder lineage, which means everyone had to go out and earn his living. There were no meetings like this where disciples met in large numbers with the Guru and asked him questions. Travel was difficult. There were no buses, trains and planes. In the old days the Guru did the traveling on foot, while the disciples stayed at home and looked after their families. The Guru walked from village to village to meet the disciples. If he met someone he thought was ready to be included in the sampradaya, he would initiate him with mantra of the lineage. That was the only teaching given out. The disciple would repeat the mantra and periodically the Guru would come to the village to see what progress was being made. When the Guru knew that he was about to pass away, he would appoint one of the householder-devotees to be the new Guru, and that new Guru would then take on the teaching duties: walking from village to village, initiating new devotees and supervising the progress of the old ones.

Nisargadatta also told:

There is a succession of Gurus and their disciples, who in turn train more disciples and thus the line is maintained. But the continuity of tradition is informal and voluntary. It is like a family name, but here the family is spiritual.

Nisargadatta also explained:

Q:How does one become a Navnath? By initiation or by succession?

M:Neither. The 'Nine Masters' tradition, Navnath Parampara, is like a river -- it flows into the ocean of reality and whoever enters it is carried along.

Q:Does it imply acceptance by a living master belonging to the same tradition?

M:Those who practice the sadhana of focusing their minds on 'I am' may feel related to others who have followed the same sadhana succeeded. They may decide to verbalise their sense of kinship by calling themselves Navnaths. It gives them the pleasure of belonging to an established tradition.

Nisargadatta further explains:

Q:Do you have to realise to join the Sampradaya?

M:The Navnath Sampradayais is only a tradition, a way of teaching and practice. It does not denote a level of consciousness. If you accept a Navnath Sampradayateacher as your Guru, you join his Sampradaya. Usually you receive a token of his grace – a look, a touch, or a word, sometimes a vivid dream or a strong remembrance. Sometimes the only sign of grace is a significant and rapid change in character and behavior.

Q:I know you now for some years and I meet you regularly. The thought of you is never far from my mind. Does it make me belong to your Sampradaya?

M:Your belonging is a matter of your own feeling and conviction. After all, it is all verbal and formal. In reality there is neither Guru nor disciple, neither theory nor practice, neither ignorance nor realization. It all depends on what you take yourself to be. Know yourself correctly. There is no substitute to self-knowledge.

Q:What proof will I have that I know myself correctly?

M:You need no proofs. The experience is unique and unmistakable. It will dawn on you suddenly, when the obstacles are removed to some extent. It is like a frayed rope snapping.

Nisargadatta started to give initiations in 1951, after a "personal revelation" from his guru, Siddharameshwar Maharaj, while Ranjit Maharaj started to give initiations in 1983, almost half a century after his awakening, on request of Siddharameshwar Maharaj granddaughter-in-law:

In 1936, when he passed away, I was living my simple life because I never wanted to become a Master [laughs]. I started to teach in 1983 because my Master's granddaughter-in-law wanted me to give her a mantra. She said to me, "I want a mantra from you." If I didn't give her a mantra, then I'd be faithless to Siddharameshwar Maharaj. So by my Master's order and grace I started to teach, and at this moment I teach you. [laughs].

== See also ==
- Avadhuta
- Lingayat
- Basava
- Maharashtra
- Hindu denominations

== Sources ==
=== Printed sources ===
- Bokil, Vinayak Pandurang (1979), Rajguru Ramdas, Kamalesh P. Bokil : sole distributors, International Book Service
- Boucher, Cathy (n.d.), The Lineage of Nine Gurus. The Navnath Sampradaya and Sri Nisargadatta Maharaj
- Dabade, K.D. (1998), Sociology of religion: a case study of Nimbargi Sampradaya, Mangala Publications
- Frydman, Maurice (1987), Navanath Sampradaya. In: I Am That. Sri Nisargadatta Maharaj, Bombay: Chetana
- Kotnis, Anant Narsinha (1963), Life sketch of Sant Tatyasaheb Kotnis
- Nisargadatta (1973), I Am That (PDF), archived from the original (PDF) on 2018-01-27
- Ranade, R.D. (1982), Mysticism In Maharashtra
- UNKNOWN (April 4, 1980), Prior to Consciousness
