= Ram Balkrushna Shewalkar =

Marathi writer

Ram Balkrushna Shewalkar (2 March 1931 – 3 May 2009) was a Marathi orator, writer, and literary critic from Maharashtra, India.

He was born on 2 March 1931 in Achalpur in Amravati district of Maharashtra.

== Career ==
Shewalkar obtained post graduate college degrees in Marathi and Sanskrit literature. He taught Sanskrit in a college for some years, and served for more than 25 years as the principal of a college at Wani in Yavatmal district.

In the 1980s, musician and singer Hridaynath Mangeshkar presented to the public in Maharashtra a popular musical program Amrutacha Ghanu which was based on the poetic compositions of Dnyaneshwar. Just before his musical presentations, Shewalkar would present a scholarly commentary on Dnyaneshwar’s works. The commentary received much acclaim in the Marathi-speaking public in Maharashtra.

Shewalkar's first literary work was an anthology titled Asoshi (असोशी) (1956). He wrote 59 books, literary reviews, and anthologies. His scholarship pertained to Ramayana and Mahabharata; the works of poet saints of Maharashtra, including Dnyaneshwar, Tukaram, and Ramdas; and modern personalities like Vinayak Damodar Savarkar and Vinoba Bhave. "निवडक मराठी आत्मकथा" and "अंगारा" are the titles of two of his books.

Website: www.ramshewalkar.com

== Recognition ==
Shewalkar was a member of the Maharashtra State Film Censor Board for eleven years.

Nagpur University awarded him an honorary D. Litt. degree.

He received Dinanath Mangeshkar Kusumagraj award, Nag Bushan award, and Jeenvrati Puraskar of Vidarbha Sahitya Sangh.

He presided over Marathi Sahitya Sammelan in Panaji in 1994.
