= Ganapatrao Maharaj Kannur =

Indian guru

Sadguru Ganapatrao Maharaj Kannur
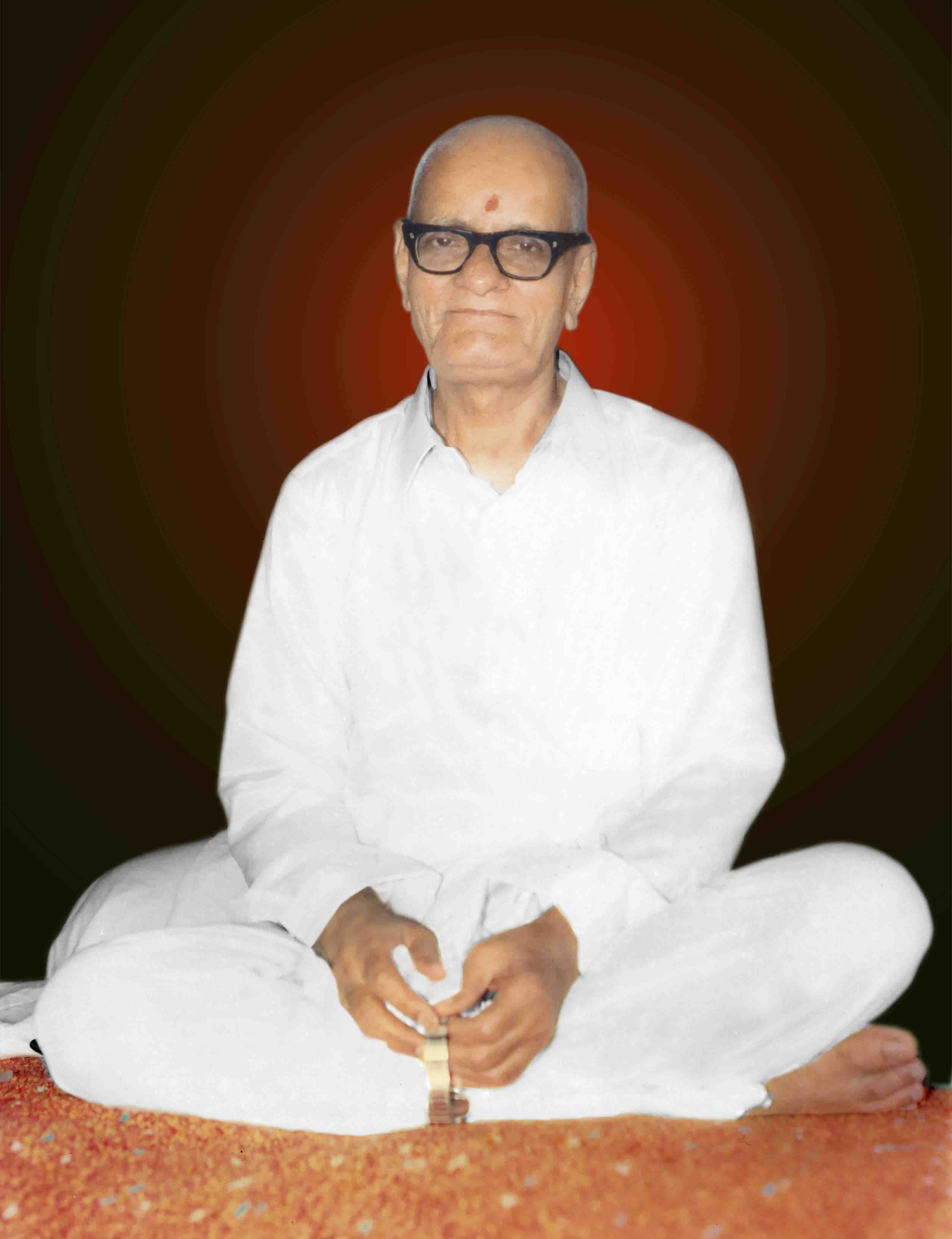
- Kannur in 1989

Personal life
- Born: Ganapatrao Shivrampant Kannur; 18 September 1909 Kannur
- Died: 20 September 2004 (aged 95) Kannur House, Bijapur

Religious life
- Religion: Hinduism

Religious career
- Teacher: Sri Siddharameshwar Maharaj

Quotation

Love everyone & Live in Happiness.

Shri Samartha Sadaguru Ganapatrao Maharaj Kannur (1909–2004) was an Indian guru in the Inchegeri Sampradaya.

== Biography ==
=== Early years ===
Kannur was born on 18 September 1909 on the day of Ganesh Chaturthi (Bhadrapad Shukla Chaturthi), in a Deshastha Brahmin family of Smt Saraswatibai & Shrimant Shivrampant Kannur, in the small village Kannur, located in the Bijapur district of Karnataka, India.

He had his primary and high-school education in Bijapur. He graduated in 1932, earning a B.Sc. (mathematics and physics) degree from Fergusson College, Pune.

=== Sri Siddharameshwar Maharaj ===
Since his early childhood days, Kannur had a great inclination towards spirituality. At the age of 13 he was blessed and initiated by Sri S.S. Siddharameshwar Maharaj, who also accepted him as his disciple and guided him to the path of self attainment.

Maharaj had given stringent directives to few of his selfless disciples: to wear ochre robes, to be devoted towards sadhana and make it the sole objective of life, not to touch money, and live with only bare minimum necessities. The disciples chose the bank of river Krishna at Audumbar and carried out tapas (penance) for a year, strictly as instructed.

=== Further study ===
Even being a graduate he decided not to take any service or job and wowed for the bow of celibacy throughout his life as not to get entangled in materialistic life. Maharaj died in 1936. After his death, Shri Ganapatrao Maharaj became firmly rooted in his doctrines, and studied the Shrimad Dasbodh, Bhagavata, Bhagavad-Gita Upanishads and other holy texts to attain the highest goal of his life - self liberation and self attainment.

=== Teaching others ===
He carried on the mantle passed to him by his Sadguru, and strived for the uplifting of common people for 60 years. To carry forward his spiritual work he founded the Shanti Kuteer Ashram. At the age of 95, on Monday 20 September 2004, he died in Kannur House, Bijapur.

== Shanti Kuteer Ashram ==
Shanti Kuteer Ashram

Shanti Kuteer is a hermitage founded by Maharaj. It is located near the village of Kannur, 25 km from Bijapur. This ashram was set up in 1951 and has gradually grown to consist of over 100 rooms for accommodation of the disciples. A temple of Lord Shree Dattatreya is located on the premises.

== Events and saptah ==
Various saptahs (spiritual fests) are held at Shanti Kuteer Kannur in a calendar year.

- Chaitra Saptah (from Chaitra Shuddha Pratipada - Gudi padwa to Ramnavami) was started in 1974 and is for nine days.
- Shravan - Ganesh Chaturthi Saptah (celebrated from Shravan Vadya Trayodashi to Ganesh Chaturthi) is celebrated at Shanti Kuteer for the past 34 years.
- Datta Jayanti (from Margashirshya Shuddha Trayodashi till Datta Jayanti) was started after the Shri Dattatraya temple was constructed at Shanti Kuteer in 1984 and is for three days.

== Sampradaja ==
	Rishi Dattatreya (Note: Frydman 1987)								
Navnath, the nine founders of the Nath Sampradaya, (Note: Boucher) (Note: Frydman 1987)
	Gahininath, (Note: Dnyaneshwar) the 5th Navnath (Note: Frydman 1987)		Revananath, the 7th (Note: Frydman 1987) or 8th (Note: Boucher) Navnath, also known as Kada Siddha (Note: Kada Siddha (website Ranade Maharaj)					Siddhagiri Math (Note: Kada Siddha (website Ranade Maharaj)) (Note: Siddhagiri Math) c.q. Kaneri Math (est. 7th (Note: Siddhagiri Math (website Shri Kshetra Siddhagiri Math, Kaneri)) or 14th century (Note: Siddhagiri Math (Gramjivan Museum)); Lingayat Parampara (Note: Kaadsiddheshwar Maharaj (website Kaadsiddheshwar Maharaj)) c.q. Kaadasiddheshwar Parampara (Note: Kaadsiddheshwar Maharaj Parampara)	
	Nivruttinath, Dnyaneshwar's brother (Note: Dnyaneshwar)		Revananath, the 7th or 8th Navnath, also known as Kada Siddha					Siddhagiri Math c.q. Kaneri Math (est. 7th or 14th century; Lingayat Parampara c.q. Kaadasiddheshwar Parampara	
	Dnyaneshwar (Note: Nisargadatta Maharaj Disciples) (1275–1296) also known as Sant Jñāneshwar or Jñanadeva (Note: Nisargadatta Maharaj Disciples) and as Kadasiddha (Note: Frydman 1987) or Kad-Siddheshwar Maharaj (Note: Boucher)							Siddhagiri Math c.q. Kaneri Math (est. 7th or 14th century; Lingayat Parampara c.q. Kaadasiddheshwar Parampara	
Different accounts: Kadasiddha, (Note: Frydman 1987) also called "Almighty "Kadsiddeshwar", (Note: Ranjit Maharaj Timeline) who appeared as a vision to Sri Gurulingajangam Maharaj (Note: Ranjit Maharaj Timeline) or The 22nd or 24th (Note: Siddhagiri Math (website siddhagirimath.org)) Shri Samarth Muppin Kaadsiddheswar Maharaj, who initiated Sri Gurulingajangam Maharaj (Note: Siddhagiri Math (website siddhagirimath.org)) or "The 25th generation of the kadsiddha at siddhagiri had then initiated Guruling jangam maharaj of nimbargi." (Note: Kada Siddha (website Balkrushna Maharaj)) or "Juangam Maharaj" c.q. "a yogi [at Siddhagiri] who gave [Nimabargi Maharaj] a mantra and told him to meditate regularly on it" (Note: Boucher)
1	Nimbargi Maharaj (1789–1875) also known as Guru Lingam-Jangam Maharaj (Note: Boucher) (Note: Nimbargi Maharj (website Ranade Maharaj) (Note: Frydman 1987)							23rd Shri Samarth Muppin Kaadsiddheswar Maharaj	
2	Shri Bhausaheb Maharaj Umdikar (Note: Boucher) (Note: Bhausaheb Maharaj (website Ganapatrao Maharj)) (1843 Umdi – 1914 Inchgiri (Note: Bhausaheb Maharaj (website Ranade Maharaj)))							24th Shri Samarth Muppin Kaadsiddheswar Maharaj	
3	Shri Amburao Maharaj of Jigjivani (1857 Jigajevani – 1933 Inchgiri) (Note: Amburao Maharaj (website Ranade Maharaj)) (Note: Frydman 1987)	Shivalingavva Akka (1867–1930) (Note: Shivalingavva Akka (website Ranade Maharaj))	Girimalleshwar Maharaj (Note: Frydman 1987) (Note: Girimalleshwar Maharaj (website Balkrushnamauli Maharaj))			Sri Siddharameshwar Maharaj (1875–1936) (Note: Boucher) (Note: Frydman 1987)		25th Shri Samarth Muppin Kaadsiddheswar Maharaj	
4	Shri Gurudev Ranade of Nimbal (1886–1957) (Note: Amburao Maharaj Maharj (website Ranade Maharaj)) (Note: Ranade Maharaj (website Ranade Maharaj)) (Note: Boucher) (Note: Frydman 1987) (Note: Ranade Maharj (website Bridge-India))		Balkrishna Maharaj (Note: Balkrishna Maharaj (website Balkrishna Maharaj))	Shri Aujekar Laxman Maharaj (Note: Nagnath Alli Maharaj (website))	Madhavananda Prabhuji (d. 25th May, 1980) (Note: Madhavananda Prabhuji (website gurusfeet.com))	Sri Nisargadatta Maharaj (1897–1981) (Note: Boucher)	Sri Ranjit Maharaj (1913–2000) (Note: Boucher) (Note: Ranjit Maharaj (website Ranjit Maharaj)) (Note: Ranjit Maharaj Interview) (Note: Ranjit Maharaj Satsang); Sri Ganapatrao Maharaj Kannur (1909–2004) (Note: Bhausaheb Maharaj (website Ganapatrao Maharaj)); Shri Vilasanand Maharaj (1909–1993); Shri Ranachhodray Maharaj, Baitkhol Karwar	26th Shri Muppin Kaadsiddheshwar Maharaj (1905–2001) Student of Sri Siddharameshwar Maharaj (Note: Kaadsiddheshwar Maharaj (website Kaadsiddheshwar Maharaj))	
5	Shri Gurudev Chandra Bhanu Pathak (Note: Ranjit Maharaj (website Angelfire))		Bhausaheb Maharaj (Nandeshwar) (Note: Bhausaheb Maharaj (Nandeshwar) (website Balkrishna Maharaj))	Shri Nagnath Alli Maharaj (Note: Nagnath Alli Maharaj (website Nagnath Alli Maharaj))		Maurice Frydman (Note: Nisargadatta Maharaj Disciples); Ramesh Balsekar (Note: Nisargadatta Maharaj Disciples); Gautam Sachdeva (Note: Gautam Sachdeva); Ramakant Maharaj (Note: Ramakant Maharj (website Ramakant Maharaj)); Alexander Smit (Note: Nisargadatta Maharaj Disciples); Douwe Tiemersma (Note: Nisargadatta Maharaj Disciples); Robert Powell (Note: Nisargadatta Maharaj Disciples); Timothy Conway (Note: Nisargadatta Maharaj Disciples); Jean Dunn (Note: Nisargadatta Maharaj Disciples) (Note: Jean Dunn (website Ed Muzika)) (Note: Jean Dunn (website Ngeton)); Mark McCloskey (Note: Nisargadatta Maharaj Disciples); "Sailor" Bob Adamson (Note: Nisargadatta Maharaj Disciples) (Note: Sailor Bob Adamson (website Sailor Bob Adamson)); Stephen Wolinksky (Note: Nisargadatta Maharaj Disciples); Mark West (Note: Nisargadatta Maharaj Disciples); David Hargrove (Note: Nisargadatta Maharaj Disciples)		27th head: Adrushya Kadsiddheshwar Swamiji (Note: Siddhagiri Math – History (website siddhagirimath.org)	Jagadguru Ramanandacharya Shree Swami Narendracharyaji Maharaj (Note: Narendracharyaji Maharaj (website Narendracharyaji Maharaj))
Notes for table Notes Sources: Boucher, Cathy (2002), The Lineage of Nine Gurus. The Navnath Sampradaya and Sri Nisargadatta Maharaj; Frydman, Maurice (1987), Navanath Sampradaya. In: I Am That. Sri Nisargadatta Maharaj, Bombay: Chetana; Websites: Amburao Maharaj (website Ranade Maharaj): Gurudev R.D. Ranade, Sadguru Shri Amburao Maharaj Archived 2008-07-22 at the Wayback Machine; Balkrishna Maharaj (website Balkrishna Maharaj): balkrushnamauli.com, Samarth Sadguru Balkrushna Maharaj; Bhausaheb Maharaj (website Ranade Maharaj): Gurudev R.D. Ranade, Sadguru Shri Bhausaheb Maharaj Umdikar; Bhausaheb Maharaj (website Ganapatrao Maharaj): ShantiKuteer Ashram, Bhausaheb Maharaj; Bhausaheb Maharaj (Nandeshwar) (website Balkrishna Maharaj): balkrushnamauli.com, Shri Bhausaheb Maharaj (Nandeshwar); Dnyaneshwar: V. V. Shirvaikar, A brief biography of saint Dnyaneshwar (Jnanadeva); Gautam Sachdeva: gautamsachdeva.com, About Gautam Sachdeva; Girimalleshwar Maharaj (website Balkrushnamauli Maharaj): balkrushnamauli.com, Girimalleshwar Maharaj; Jean Dunn (website Ed Muzika): Jean Dunn and Nisargadatta Maharaj; Jean Dunn (website Ngeton): Ngeton, Navnath Masters; Kaadsiddheshwar Maharaj (website Kaadsiddheshwar Maharaj): Mazad Sad Guru, Biography; Kaadsiddheshwar Maharaj Parampara: mazasadguru.com, The Kaadsiddheshwar Parampara; Kada Siddha (website Ranade Maharaj): Gurudev R.D. Ranade, Kada Siddha; Kada Siddha (website Balkrushna Maharaj): Balkrushna Maharaj, Kadsiddheshwar Maharaj; Madhavananda Prabhuji (website gurusfeet.com)Gurus Feet, Madhavananda Prabhuji; Nagnath Alli Maharaj (website Nagnath Alli Maharaj): Shri S.S. Nagnath Alli Maharaj Sansthan, About us; Narendracharyaji Maharaj (website Narendracharyaji Maharaj): A brief biography of Jagadguru Ramanandacharya Sri Swami Narendracharyaji Maharaj; Nimbargi Maharaj (website Ranade Maharaj): Gurudev R.D. Ranade, Sadguru Shri Guruling Jangam Maharaj; Nisargadatta Maharaj Commemorations pt.1: David Godman, Remembering Nisargadatta Maharaj pt.1; Nisargadatta Maharaj Disciples: Advaita Vision, Navnath Sampradaya. Disciples of Nisargadatta Maharaj; Ramakant Maharaj (website Ramakant Maharaj): Shri Ramakant Maharaj, Information; Ranade Maharaj (website Ranade Maharaj): Gurudev R.D. Ranade, Shri Gurudev R. D. Ranade; Ranade Maharaj (website Bridge-India): Bridge-India, Shri Gurudev R.D. Ranade; Ranjit Maharaj (website Ranjit Maharaj): Sadguru.com, Shri Ranjit Maharaj; Ranjit Maharaj Timeline: Sadguru.com, Shri Ranjit Maharaj History; Ranjit Maharaj Interview: InnerQuest, Ranjit interview; Ranjit Maharaj Satsang: inner-quest.org, "Final Reality has no beginning and no end."; Ranjit Maharaj (website Angelfire): Sri Ranjit Maharaj profile; Sailor Bob Adamson (website Sailor Bob Adamson): Sailor Bob Adamson website; Shivalingavva Akka (website Ranade Maharaj): gurudevranade.com, Rv. Smt.Shri.Shivalingavva Akka; Siddhagiri Math: Detailed history of Shri Nisarghadatta Maharaj; Siddhagiri Math (website Shri Kshetra Siddhagiri Math, Kaneri): Shri Kshetra Siddhagiri Math, Kaneri; Siddhagiri Math (Gramjivan Museum): Siddhagiri Gramjivan Museum Kaneri Math; Siddhagiri Math (website siddhagirimath.org): siddhagirimath.org, Siddhagiri Math – Pedigree; Siddhagiri Math – History (website siddhagirimath.org): siddhagirimath.org, Siddhagiri Math – History

Shri Samartha Sadaguru Bhausaheb Maharaj

Shri Samartha Sadaguru Siddharameshwar Maharaj

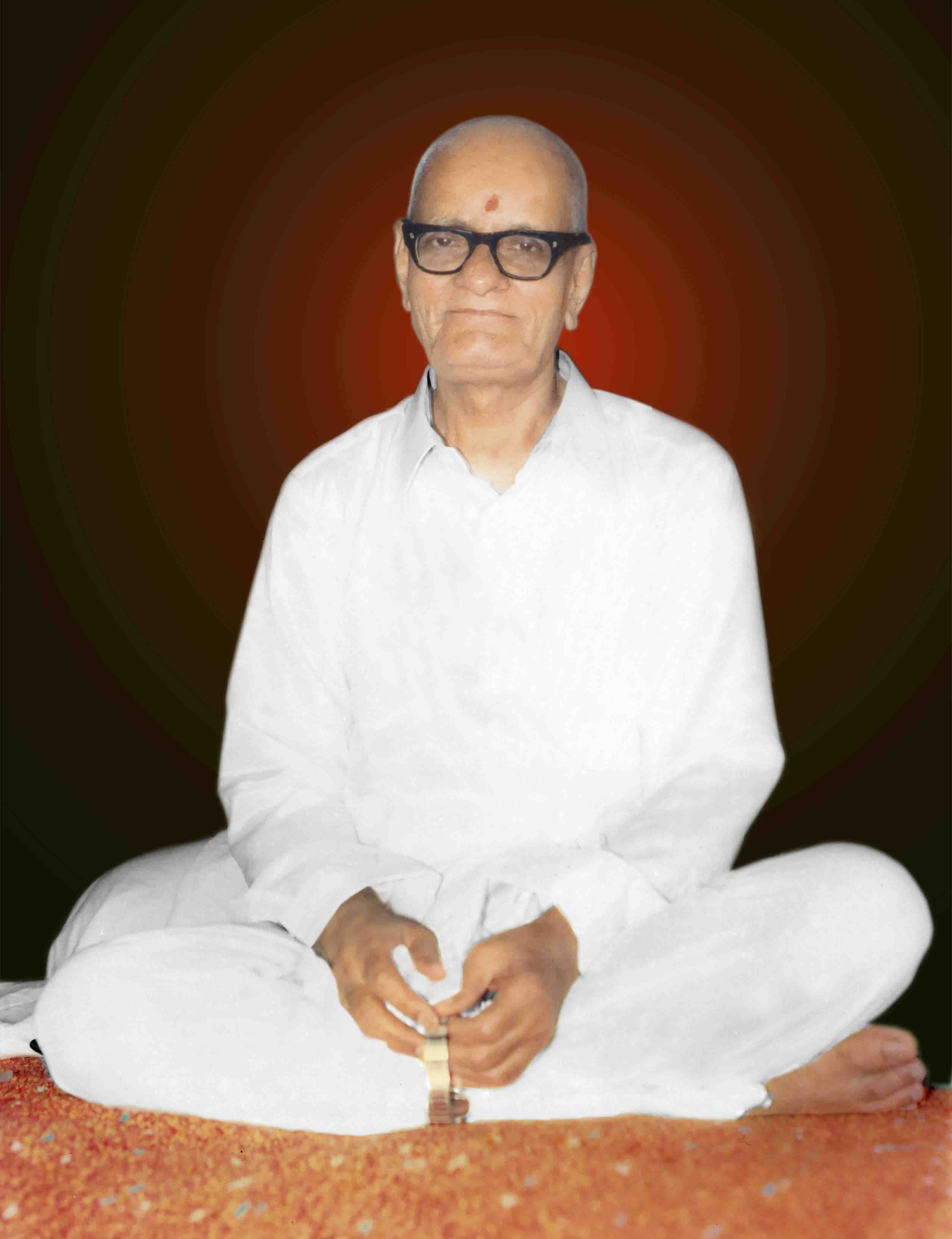
Sri Samartha Sadaguru Ganapatrao Maharaj Kannur

=== Navnath ===
Maharaj traces his sampradaya to the Navanath Sampraday. It was started by Adiguru Shri Dattatreya, and was further carried by the Navanaths, the Holy Nine Gurus.

One of those Navnaths was Adiguru Sri Revanatah, who initiated Kaadasiddheshwar Swami Maharaj. Kaadasiddheshwar founded the Kaneri Ashram in the 13th century, which became a Dnyan Peeth. Many solace seekers were initiated for centuries.

=== Nimbargi sampraday ===
In the mid-19th century, the then Shri Kaadasiddheshwar Swami Maharaj initiated Shri Gurulingajangam Maharaj, also known as "Nimbarji Maharaj". He founded the Nimbargi sampraday and initiated Shri Raghunathpriya Sadhu Maharaj.

Shri Raghunathpriya Sadhu Maharaj initiated Shri Samartha Sadaguru Bhausaheb Maharaj Deshpande, who was an ardent follower and a devoted disciple of Shri Gurulingajangam Maharaj.

=== Inchegeri sampraday ===
Shri Bhausaheb Maharaj established the Inchegeri Sampradaya. He preached the principle of non-dualness, advait tatva, and used to give discourses on Srimad Dasbodh.

Sri Bhausaheb Maharaj had many followers, many of which further rose to the state of Gurupad, and practised and preached the Principles of Vedant and Advait throughout India.

Sri Siddharameshwar Maharaj was his disciple and ardent follower. Siddharameshwar professed the knowledge and basics of self-realization to the masses and became one of the most followed Guru of Inchegeri sampraday. Shri Maharaj was blessed and initiated by Siddharameshwar at the age of thirteen.

== Publications ==
Maharaji's words came from the depth of his own experience. The acceptance of one being supreme and being one with the universe was the core of his discourses. Maharaj was ever vigilant about the welfare of his disciples, specifically about their spiritual progress. Hence he wrote a number of texts on the different aspects of spirituality. He also founded the publication Adhyatma Bhandar and all the books are published by it. Amongst them are:

- Atmadnyanachi Gurukilli
- Srimad Dasbodh – Kannada translation
- Atmadnyanand Rasaduta / Atmadnyananachi Panchapakwanne
- Adhyatmada Anagayinelli / Adhyatmacha Deepstambha
- Anubhava Jnana
- Yashashvi Jeevan Darshan
- Sulabh Atmajnana (Easy steps to self-realisation).
- Shantikuteer Sandesh

Shantikuteer Sandesh is a quarterly periodical published by Shantikuteer Trust. The periodical is available in the Kannada and Marathi languages.

== Sources ==
- Dabade, K.B. (1998), Sociology of Religion: A Case Study of Nimbargi Sampradaya, Mangala Publications
