= Maruti Stotra =

Hindu devotional song

Maruti Stotra or Hanuman Stotra is a 17th-century stotra, hymn of praise, composed in Marathi language by Samarth Ramdas saint-poet of Maharashtra. It is a compilation of praiseful verses that describe the many aspects and virtues of Hindu god Hanuman, also known as Maruti Nandan.

Maruti, also known as Hanuman, is the deity of strength and is worshiped at most Akhadas or traditional gymnasiums by athletes (wrestlers). These verses are typically recited at the commencement of daily activities at most Akhadas or wrestling gymnasiums in Maharashtra. Almost all cadets at the Akhadas or traditional gymnasiums start their daily programs with this Maruti Stotra.

== See also ==
- Hanuman Stuti, another hymn by the same author.
