= Dasbodh =

17th century Indian Bhakti text

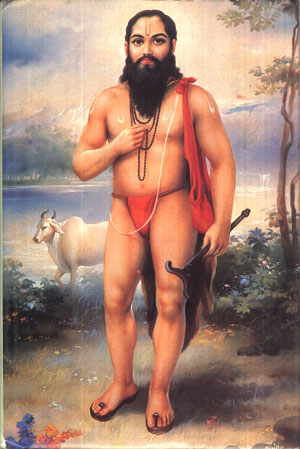
Samarth Ramdas

Dāsbodh, loosely meaning "advice to the disciple" in Marathi, is a 1654 bhakti (devotion) and jnana (insight) spiritual text. It was orally narrated by the saint Samarth Ramdas to his disciple, Kalyan Swami. The Dāsbodh provides readers with spiritual guidance on matters such as devotion and acquiring knowledge. Besides this, it also helps in answering queries related to day-to-day life and how to find solutions to it.

The book is written in verse form. It provides instructions on the religious life, presented in the format of a philosophical dialogue between a Guru and his disciple. The volume comprises 7751 owi and is divided into 20 chapters, each chapter consisting of ten sub-chapters. Each of these sub-chapters varies in the number of stanzas, but averages around 30-40 stanzas (ovi) per sub-chapter, with some being considerably longer. The book has been translated into several languages, including German, English, Hindi, Tamil, Telugu, Kannada, Gujarati, and Sindhi.

== Background ==
The Dāsbodha was written in 1654 by Samarth Ramdas Swāmi (1608-1681), a satguru, a Hindu saint from Maharashtra, in the classical Marathi language. It is a comprehensive volume in verse form providing instructions on the religious life, presented in the format of a dialogue between a Guru and disciple. The narration is believed to have taken place in a cave called Shivthar Ghal (pronounced shiv-ther-gaal) in the Raigad district of Maharashtra.

== Style ==
Dāsbodh is written in the verse form known as owi (ōvyā) in Marathi. The volume comprises 7751 owi and is divided into 20 chapters, each chapter consisting of ten sub-chapters. Each of these sub-chapters varies in the number of stanzas, but averages around 30-40 stanzas (ovi) per sub-chapter, with some being considerably longer.

Chapters:

1. Hymns in praise
2. Signs of fools
3. Assessment of Self attributes
4. Nine stages of communion
5. Sacred formula of Almighty
6. Search for God
7. Fourteen Brahmas
8. Chapter on Knowledge and Illusion
9. Attributes and Forms
10. Life flame of the world
11. In the name of world
12. Prudence and Renunciation
13. Name and Form
14. Uninterrupted meditation
15. Soul
16. Sun and Dynasty
17. Creation and Creator
18. Multifacted
19. Teaching
20. Complete-whole

== Contents ==
Dāsbodh prescribes the path of devotion to God or "Bhakti mārg", and the path of Knowledge or "Jñana Marg" for liberation. Through knowledge, Ramdas clears away all doubts and gives the understanding of one's "True Self". Ramdas also reveals the true meaning and significance of "Discrimination" and "Detachment".

It deals with diverse aspects of human life such as politics, conducting business dealings and taking care of one's body and family life. Saint Ramdas taught disciples to avoid laziness and earn livelihood in a virtuous manner. He encouraged them to work towards their goals rather than relying on God without putting in one's effort.

In Dasbodh, Samartha Ramdas presents the essence of many Vedic texts. Dasbodh is a manual for life, in the highest sense, and is somewhat unusual among spiritual literature in that it not only expounds the classic themes of discrimination between the true and the untrue and the detachment commonly found in Vedic literature, but also provides a detailed instruction on how to function and excel in society from a place of deep spiritual understanding.

Contained within the chapters of Dasbodh, Ramdas outlines the path of liberation through Devotion and Knowledge. Through knowledge, Ramdas clears away all doubts and gives the understanding of one's "True Self." Ramdas also reveals the true meaning and significance of "Discrimination" and "Detachment." Entire volumes could be written in trying to describe all that is contained within the text. It draws upon ancient Vedic texts including, but not limited to; The Vedas, the Shashtras, the Upanishads, the Avadhut Gita, the Bhagavad Gita, the Rama Gita, the Yogavasishtha, the Guru Gita, and the Brahma Sutras, to name a few. Mainly what is presented in Dasbodh is the voice of direct experience itself.

Dasbodha is an epic written by Shree Samarth. Whatever he wanted to tell the world he has conveyed through Dasbodha in a candid manner. As per the tradition in his times he wrote it in the Owi form. The contents of the book are simple, straightforward and easy to understand. It is so simple that sometimes it seems to be a prose. Dasbodha is divided in 20 main parts called as Dashak each of which contains 10 sub parts which are called as Samasas. The total Owis number 7751. Each Owi is made up of 4 lines. After being blessed by Lord Ram he wrote the Old Dasbodha. One finds the freshness, fearlessness and candidness of a person blessed with the ultimate knowledge just recently in it. After a while he started with the continuation of the work and completed up to the 7th Dashak to which he added the Dashak he had written earlier, called the Dashak of knowledge. Then throughout his life he continued writing for the Dasbodha which amounted to another 12 Dashaks. These were added to the earlier 8 ones and the final volume of the Dasbodha as we know it now was prepared just 2 months prior to the time when Shree Samarth left his mortal body. At the end of the book he has unassumingly asked the readers to study, ponder over, introspect and not just only read the whole Dasbodha.

== Popularity ==
Dāsbodh has been popular for many years in India. Only recently has it begun to receive recognition in the Western world. Dāsbodh is recommended by the Inchegeri Sampradaya, including Shri Siddharameshwar Maharaj.

== Translations ==
Dāsbodh has been translated into many Indian and other languages including German, English, Hindi, Tamil, Telugu, Kannada, Gujarati and Sindhi.

- Sanskrit
- Hindi (four different authors (Chitrashala press Poona copy, Bharatiya Vidya Bhavan, Mumbai, copy, Hindi Sahitya Kutir, Banaras copy and Quills Ink))
  - Shree Ramdas Swami (2014), GRANTHRAJ DASBODH, Suresh Sumant, Quills Ink Private Limited
- Telugu (Sundaraiyya vidnyan kendram copy and Vedavyas Mudraksharshala chittur copy)
- Kannada
- Tamil
- Sindhi
- English (four different authors)
  - SADGURU SHREE SAMARTH RAMDAS SWAMI MAHARAJ, THE DASBODHA (PDF), siddharameshwar.org
  - Samartha Ramdas (2010), Dasbodh - Spiritual Instruction for the Servant, Sadguru Publishing
