= Ramchandra Dattatreya Ranade =

Indian philosopher

Ramchandra Dattatrey Ranade
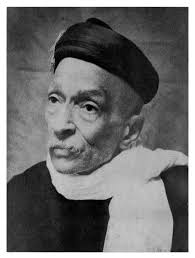
- Born: 1886 A.D. Jamakhandi, Bagalkot District, Karnataka, India
- Died: 1957 A.D. Nimbal, near Bijapur, Karnataka, India
- Occupations: Teaching, Retired as Head of Department of Philosophy, Allahabad University; Vice-Chancellor, Allahabad University.
- Known for: His work on Upanishads – A Constructive Survey of Upanishadic Philosophy

Ramchandra Dattatrey Ranade (1886–1957) was an Indian scholar-philosopher-saint of Karnataka and Maharashtra.

== Biography ==
He was born on 3 July 1886 in Jamakhandi, in Bagalkot District of Karnataka. After completing his schooling he studied at Deccan College, Pune. In the year 1914 he passed M.A. with full honours and for a very brief period joined the teaching staff of Fergusson College, Pune. He taught at Willindon College, Sangli, on a regular basis before being invited to join Allahabad University as Head of Department of Philosophy where he rose to be the Vice-Chancellor. After retirement in 1946 he lived in an ashrama in a small village, Nimbal, on border of Maharashtra and Karnataka, near Vijaypura (Bijapur) where he died on 6 June 1957.

== Philosophy ==
According to Ranade, the three main approaches in arriving at the solution to the problem of the Ultimate Reality have traditionally been the theological, the cosmological and the psychological approaches. The cosmological approach involves looking outward, to the world; the psychological approach meaning looking inside or to the Self; and the theological approach is looking upward or to God. Descartes takes the first and starts with the argument that the Self is the primary reality, self-consciousness the primary fact of existence, and introspection the start of the real philosophical process. According to him, we can arrive at the conception of God only through the Self because it is God who is the cause of the Self and thus, we should regard God as more perfect than the Self. Spinoza on the other hand, believed that God is the be-all and the end-all of all things, the alpha and the omega of existence. From God philosophy starts, and in God philosophy ends. The manner of approach of the Upanishadic philosophers to the problem of ultimate reality was neither the Cartesian nor Spinozistic. The Upanishadic philosophers regarded the Self as the ultimate existence and subordinated the world and God to the Self. The Self to them, is more real than either the world or God. It is only ultimately that they identify the Self with God, and thus bridge over the gulf that exists between the theological and psychological approaches to reality. They take the cosmological approach to start with, but they find that this cannot give them the solution of the ultimate reality. So, Upanishadic thinkers go back and start over by taking the psychological approach and here again, they cannot find the solution to the ultimate reality. They therefore perform yet another experiment by taking the theological approach. They find that this too is lacking in finding the solution. They give yet another try to the psychological approach, and come up with the solution to the problem of the ultimate reality. Thus, the Upanishadic thinkers follow a cosmo-theo-psychological approach. A study of the mukhya Upanishads shows that the Upanishadic thinkers progressively build on each other's ideas. They go back and forth and refute improbable approaches before arriving at the solution of the ultimate reality.

== Works ==
His seminal work, A Constructive Survey of Upanishadic Philosophy, was published by Oriental Books Agency, Pune, in 1926 under the patronage of Sir Parashuramarao Bhausaheb, Raja of Jamkhandi. He also wrote Pathway to God in Hindi and Marathi and Ramdasvacanamrut, which is based on the scriptures of Samarth Ramdas. As an scholar of the Upanishads who specialised in Greek philosophy, Ranade emphasised the centrality of the psychological approach as opposed to the theological approach for the proper understanding of the Ultimate Reality. His works also include:

- Pathway to God in Kannada Literature.
- The Bhagavadgita as Philosophy of God Realisation.
- Evolution of My Own Thought.
- Ekanath Vachanamrut.
- Sant Vachanamrut.

== Sources ==
- Ranade, R. D. (1926), A constructive survey of Upanishadic philosophy, Bharatiya Vidya Bhavan
