= Samarth Ramdas =

17th-century poet-saint in India

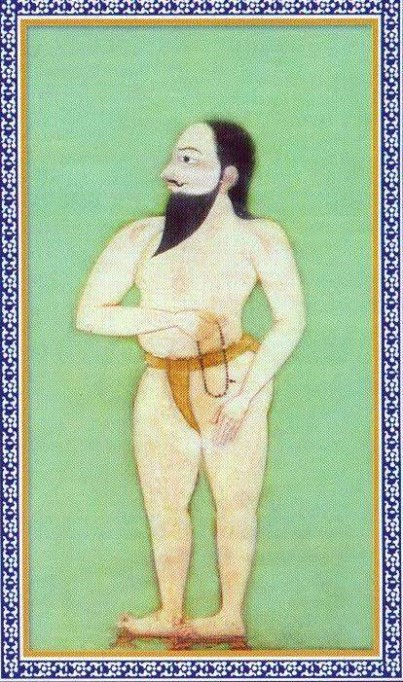
- Portrait of Ramdas by Meru Swami, c.17th-century

Personal life
- Born: Narayan Thosar c. 1608 Jamb, Ahmadnagar Sultanate
- Died: 1682 (aged 73–74) Sajjangad, Satara, Maratha Empire
- Notable work(s): Dasbodh, Manobodh, Aatmaram, Manache Shlok, more

Religious life
- Religion: Hinduism
- Founder of: Samarth sect
- Philosophy: Bhakti Yoga, Vaishnavism

Religious career
- Disciples: Kalyan Swami, Uddhav Swami, Krishnabai, Akka Swami

Ramdas (c. 1608 – c. 1682), also Samarth Ramdas or Ramdas Swami, was an Indian Hindu saint, philosopher, poet, mystic and spiritual master. He was a devotee of the Hindu deities Rama and Hanuman.

== Early life ==
Ramdas was born as Narayan Thosar at Jamb, a village in present-day Jalna District, Maharashtra, on the occasion of Rama Navami in 1608. He was born to Suryajipant and Ranubai Thosar, and brought up in a Marathi Deshastha Rigvedi Brahmin family. He had an elder brother named Gangadhar. His father, Suryajipant, was a devotee of Surya, a Vedic deity. Suryajipant died in either 1615 or 1616. Ramdas turned into an introvert after the demise of his father and would often be engrossed in thoughts about the divine.

Historical information about his early life is scarce. According to legend, Ramdas—then known as Narayan—fled his wedding ceremony at the age of twelve. He did so upon hearing a pandit (Hindu priest) chant 'Saawadhaana!' (Beware!) during the wedding ritual. Later, he walked hundreds of miles along the banks of the river Godavari to Panchavati, a Hindu pilgrimage town near Nashik. He then moved to Taakli, near Nashik, at the confluence of the Godavari and Nandini rivers. At Taakli, he spent the next twelve years as an ascetic in complete devotion to the deity Rama. During this period, he adhered to a rigorous daily routine and devoted most of his time to meditation, worship and exercise. He is claimed to have attained enlightenment at the age of 24. He adopted the name Ramdas around this time. He also installed and consecrated an idol of the deity Hanuman at Taakli.

== Pilgrimage and spiritual movement ==
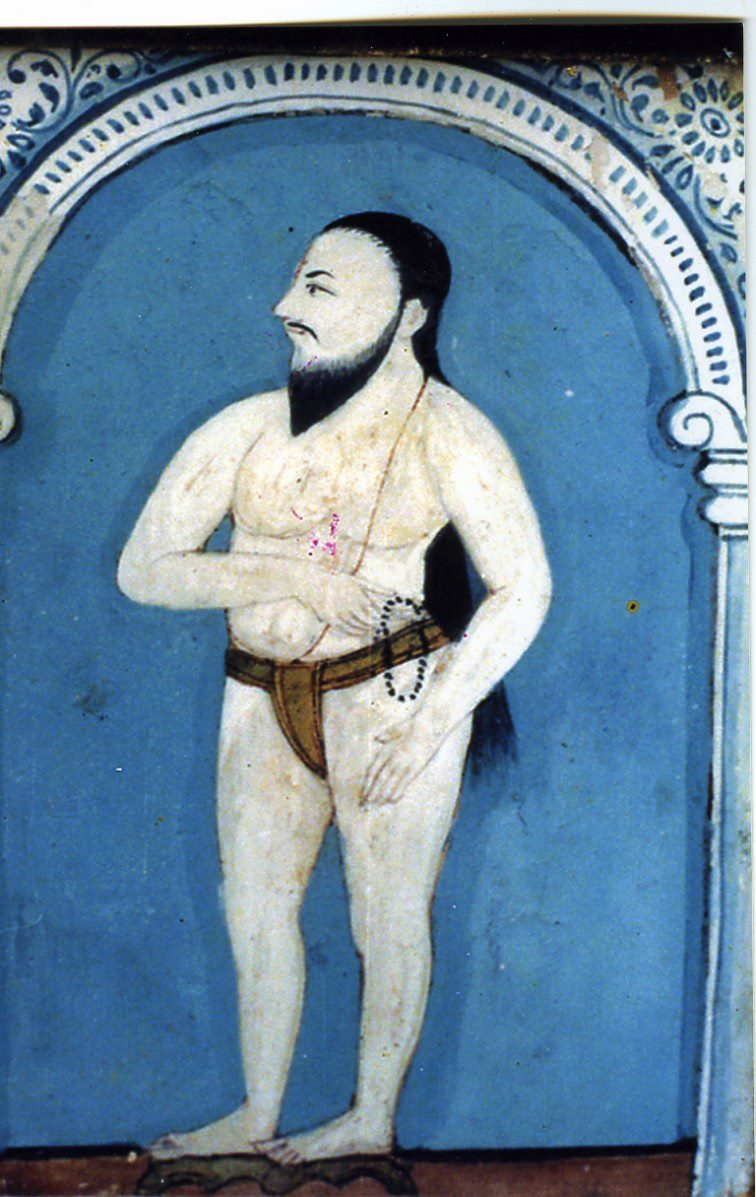
Portrait of Ramdas by an unknown artist, c.17th-century

He departed Taakli and embarked on a pilgrimage across the Indian subcontinent. He travelled for twelve years and made observations on contemporary social life. He noted these observations in two of his literary works Asmani Sultania and Parachakraniroopan. These works provide rare insights into the then prevailing social conditions in the Indian subcontinent. He also travelled to regions in the vicinity of the Himalayas during this period. He met the sixth Sikh guru Hargobind at Srinagar.

After pilgrimage, he returned to Mahabaleshwar, a hill-town near Satara. Later at Masur, he arranged for Rama Navami celebrations that were reportedly attended by thousands. He established several matha or monasteries. Common estimates suggest that he may have established somewhere between 700 and 1100 monasteries during his travels. Narahar Phatak in his biography of Ramdas claims that the actual number of monasteries founded by him may have been fewer. Around 1648, he installed an idol of Rama at a newly built temple in Chaphal, a village near Satara. He had eleven Hanuman temples constructed in various regions of southern Maharashtra. These temples are collectively known as 11-Maruti (see list below).

11-Maruti
Location	Region	Year
Shahapur	Karad	1644
Masur	Karad	1645
Chaphal Vir Maruti	Satara	1648
Chaphal Das Maruti	Satara	1648
Shinganwadi	Satara	1649
Umbraj	Masur	1649
Majgaon	Satara	1649
Bahe	Sangli	1651
Manapadale	Kolhapur	1651
Pargaon	Warananagar	1651
Shirala	Sangli	1654

== Literary contribution and philosophy ==
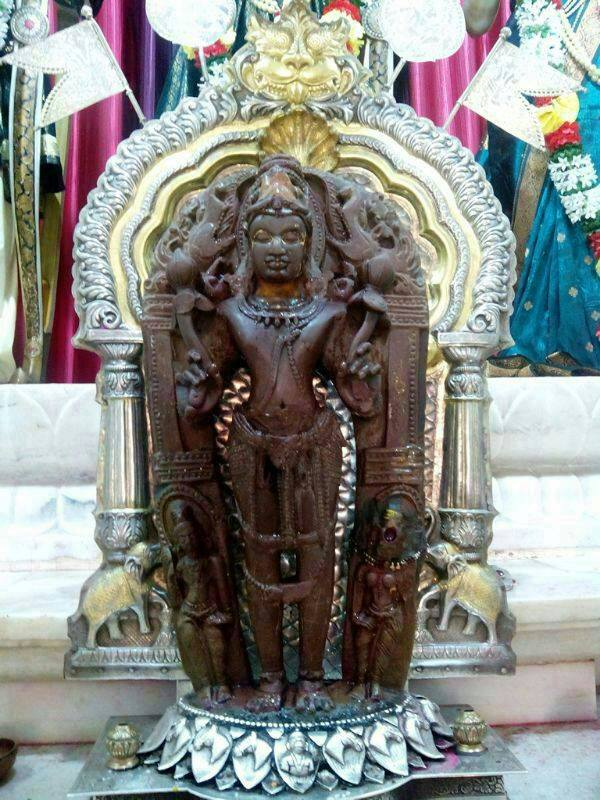
Idol of Rama, Chaphal

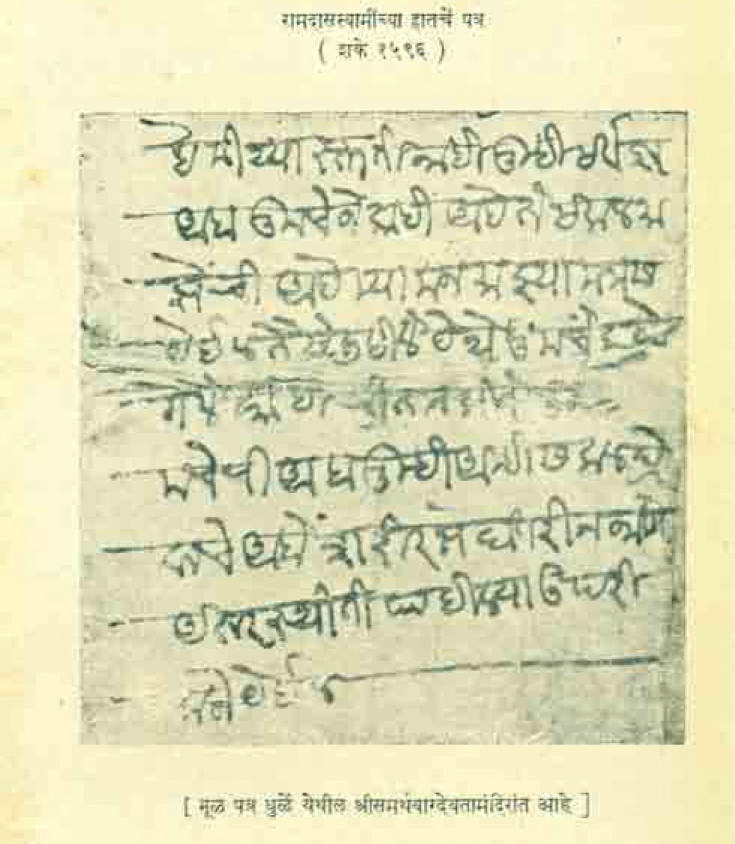
Handwriting of Ramdas in Modi Script

=== Literary works ===
Ramdas wrote extensive literature during his lifetime. His literary works include Dasbodh, Karunashtakas, Sunderkand, Yuddhakand, Poorvarambh, Antarbhav, Aatmaaram, Chaturthman, Panchman, Manpanchak, Janaswabhawgosavi, Panchsamasi, Saptsamasi, Sagundhyan, Nirgundhyan, Junatpurush, Shadripunirupan, Panchikaranyog and Manache Shlok. Unlike saints of the Warkari tradition, he did not embrace pacifism. His writings evoke strong expressions encouraging militant means to resist contemporary Islamic rulers.

A major portion of his Marathi literature is in the form of verses. Listed below are some of his notable literary works.

- Manache Shlok (co-written by Kalyan Swami)
- Dasbodh
- Shree Maruti Stotra
- Aatmaaram
- 11-Laghu Kavita
- Shadripu Nirupan
- Maan Panchak
- Chaturthmaan
- Raamayan (Marathi-Teeka)

His compositions include numerous aarati or devotional hymns. One of his most well-known aarati commemorates the Hindu deity Ganesha, and is popularly known as Sukhakarta Dukhaharta. It is believed that the bhajan or devotional song, Raghupati Raghava Raja Ram, is based on a mantra composed by Ramdas.

His other works include the aarati commemorating Hanuman, Satrane Uddane Hunkaar Vadani, and the aarati dedicated to the Hindu deity Vitthala, Panchanan Haivahan Surabhushan Lila. He also composed aarti in dedication to other Hindu deities. His well-known work, Dasbodh, has been translated to several other Indian languages.

=== Philosophy ===
Ramdas was an exponent of Bhakti Yoga or the path of devotion. According to him, total devotion to Rama brings about spiritual evolution. His definition of bhakti or devotion was in accordance with the philosophy of Advaita Vedanta. In chapter four of Dasbodh, he describes nine levels of devotion or communion; beginning with listening or shravan to total surrender or aatmanivedan.

He emphasized on the significance of physical strength and knowledge towards individual development. He expressed his admiration for warriors and highlighted their role in safeguarding the society. He was of the opinion that saints must not withdraw from society, but rather actively engage towards social transformation. He aimed to revive the Hindu culture after its gradual disintegration over several centuries due to continuous foreign occupation. He also called for unity among the Marathas to preserve and promote the regional culture.

He encouraged the participation of women in religious work and offered them positions of authority. He had 18 female disciples, among whom Vennabai headed the monastery at Miraj near Sangli. Akkabai supervised the monasteries at Chaphal and Sajjangad. He once reprimanded an aged man who voiced his opposition to female participation in religious affairs. Ramdas reportedly responded by saying "Everyone came from a woman's womb and those who did not understand the importance of this were unworthy of being called men". In Dasbodh, Ramdas eulogizes the virtues of aesthetic handwriting (Chapter 19.10, Stanza 1–3p).

== Samarth sect ==
Ramdas founded the Samarth sect to revive religion and spirituality among various sections of the Indian society. He established several monasteries during his lifetime.

== Links with contemporaries ==
=== Chhatrapati Shivaji Maharaj ===
Some historical accounts and popular traditions claim Ramdas to be a spiritual mentor to the first Maratha ruler, Chhatrapati Shivaji Maharaj. Disputing accounts present a contradictory view of there being no direct association between the two. Both sets of claims have been debated among scholars and historians.

=== Chhatrapati Sambhaji Maharaj ===
Samarth Ramdas Swami, a renowned 17th-century saint and poet, shared an important connection with Chhatrapati Sambhaji Maharaj as an elder statesman and spiritual advisor. After the passing of Chhatrapati Shivaji Maharaj, Samarth Ramdas wrote a famous advisory letter to young Sambhaji Maharaj to guide him on statecraft and his duties as the new king.

=== Guru Hargobind ===
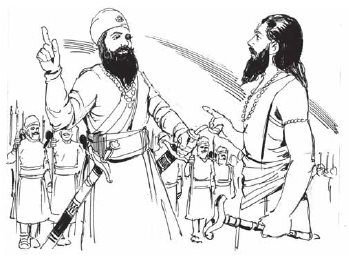
Ramdas with Hargobind

According to a manuscript in the Sikh tradition known as Panjāh Sakhīān, Ramdas met Hargobind at Srinagar near the Garhwal Hills. This meeting also finds mention in an 18th-century Marathi literary work known as Ramdas Swamichi Bakhar, authored by Hanumant Swami. The meeting most likely took place after 1630 when Ramdas travelled to northern India and Hargobind journeyed to Nanakmatta, a town in present-day Uttarakhand. Before the meeting, Hargobind had returned from a hunting excursion.

During their conversation, Ramdas reportedly asked "I had heard that you occupy the Gaddi (seat) of Nanak. Nanak was a tyāgī sādhu, a saint who had renounced the world. You possess arms and keep an army and horses. You allow yourself to be addressed as Sacha Patshah, the true king. What sort of a sādhu are you?" Hargobind replied, "Internally a hermit and externally a prince. Arms mean protection to the poor and destruction of the tyrant. Baba Guru Nanak had not renounced the world but had renounced māyā - the self and ego." Ramdas is reported to have said, "Yeh hamare man bhavti hai" (This appeals to my mind).

== Residences ==
Ramdas moved all across the Indian subcontinent and usually resided in caves (ghal in Marathi). Some of these are listed below.

- Ramghal, Sajjangad
- Morghal, at Morbag near Sajjangad
- Tondoshighal, north of Chaphal
- Taakli, near Nashik
- Chandragiri, opposite Vasantgad, near Karad
- Helwak, near Helwak village
- Shiganwadi, near Chandragiri
- Shivtharghal, near Mahad

== Death ==
For five days before his death, Ramdas underwent Praayopaveshana, a voluntary abstinence from food and water consumption. He continuously recited the taaraka mantra "Shree Ram Jai Ram Jai Jai Ram", while resting beside an idol of Rama brought from Tanjore. His disciples, Uddhav Swami and Akka Swami, remained in his service during this period. Uddhav Swami conducted the final rites.

== Legacy ==
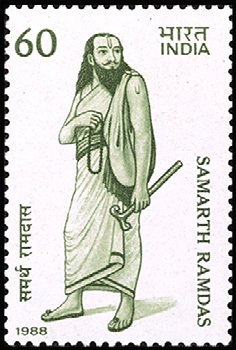
Indian Postage stamp of Samarth Ramdas, 1988

Ramdas served as an inspiration for several Indian thinkers, historians, independence activists and social reformers. Some of these include Bal Gangadhar Tilak, Keshav Hedgewar, Vishwanath Rajwade, Ramchandra Ranade and Vinayak Damodar Savarkar. Tilak derived inspiration from Ramdas when devising aggressive strategies to revolt against the British colonial rule. Nanasaheb Dharmadhikari, a spiritual teacher and social reformer, promoted his philosophy through spiritual discourses. Gondavalekar Maharaj, a 19th-century saint and guru, expounded spiritual methods of Ramdas through his own teachings. Savarkar gained inspiration from Dasbodh. Bhausaheb Maharaj, founder of the Inchegeri Sampradaya, used Dasbodh as a means of instruction to his disciples. Dasbodh has been translated and published by American followers of Ranjit Maharaj, a spiritual teacher of the Inchegeri Sampradaya.

He had a profound influence on Keshav Hedgewar, the founder of Hindu nationalist organization Rashtriya Swayamsevak Sangh. Hedgewar quoted Ramdas on numerous occasions and would often note the latter's views in his personal diary. According to one entry in his diary dated 4 March 1929, Hedgewar writes "Shri Samarth did not want anything for himself. He mindfully guarded against self-pride that could have resulted from success and greatness. Ingraining this discipline, he devoted himself to the welfare of his people and a higher self-realization."

Ramdas is a revered religious and spiritual figure in the Indian state of Maharashtra and remains relevant to present-day society due to his enduring literary contributions. The aarati, Sukhakarta Dukhaharta, composed by him in veneration of the Hindu deity Ganesha, is often recited in numerous Hindu rituals. Maruti Stotra, his hymn in praise of the deity Hanuman, is commonly recited by schoolchildren and wrestlers training at traditional wrestling schools, known as akhada, in Maharashtra. Over generations, children in Maharashtra have been reciting verses from his popular literary work, Manache Shlok, at home and school. His teachings and philosophy have been promoted and endorsed by various political and social organizations in Maharashtra.

== Bibliography ==
- Swami Sivananda (2005). "Samartha Ramdas". Lives of Saints. Divine Life Society.
- Swami Paratparananda (2005). "Samartha Ramdas and Dasbodha". Dasbodha:A work of Sri Samarth Ramdasa. Vedanta Kesari.

== Sources ==
- "Shakti Saushthava शक्ती सौष्ठव" by D. G. Godse
- "Vinoba Saraswat" by Vinoba Bhave (edited by Ram Shewalkar)
- "Rajwade Lekhsangrah" by Vishwanath Kashinath Rajwade (edited by Tarkatirth Laxmanshastri Joshi)
- "Tryambak Shankar Shejwalkar Nivadak Lekhsangrah" by T S Shejwalkar (collection- H V Mote, Introduction- G D Khanolkar)
