= Ranjit Maharaj =

- Born: 4 January 1913
- Died: 15 November 2000 (aged 87)

Sri Ranjit Maharaj (4 January 1913 – 15 November 2000) was an Indian spiritual teacher in the Navnath Inchegeri Sampradaya tradition, and disciple of Siddharameshwar Maharaj.

== Biography ==
Ranjit Maharaj was born on 4 January 1913. His father died when he was 6 years old. In 1924, he met Siddharameshwar Maharaj. The following year he was initiated by Siddharameshwar Maharaj. In 1934, at the age of 21, he got initiated into monkhood. Only in 1983, at the age of 70, he initiated his first disciple, Shri Siddharameshwar Maharaj's granddaughter-in-law. Hereafter, he started to attract an international following. In 1996, he was invited to visit Germany, France and the USA. In the following years, he visited these countries several times, as well as the UK, Switzerland and Spain, until 2000, when he died.

== Inchegeri Sampradaya ==
Ranjit Maharaj belongs to the Inchegiri Sampradaya, a lineage of teachers belonging to the Navnath tradition. Ranjit was responsible for instigating the translation, printing and publication into the English language of the spiritual classic, "Master of Self Realization" (Adhyatma Dnyanacha Yogeshwar), that are the utterances of His Guru Siddharameshwar Maharaj. These utterances had been recorded by Ranjit's fellow devotee Nisargadatta Maharaj before Nisargadatta's realization.

	Rishi Dattatreya (Note: Frydman 1987)								
Navnath, the nine founders of the Nath Sampradaya, (Note: Boucher) (Note: Frydman 1987)
	Gahininath, (Note: Dnyaneshwar) the 5th Navnath (Note: Frydman 1987)		Revananath, the 7th (Note: Frydman 1987) or 8th (Note: Boucher) Navnath, also known as Kada Siddha (Note: Kada Siddha (website Ranade Maharaj)					Siddhagiri Math (Note: Kada Siddha (website Ranade Maharaj)) (Note: Siddhagiri Math) c.q. Kaneri Math (est. 7th (Note: Siddhagiri Math (website Shri Kshetra Siddhagiri Math, Kaneri)) or 14th century (Note: Siddhagiri Math (Gramjivan Museum)); Lingayat Parampara (Note: Kaadsiddheshwar Maharaj (website Kaadsiddheshwar Maharaj)) c.q. Kaadasiddheshwar Parampara (Note: Kaadsiddheshwar Maharaj Parampara)	
	Nivruttinath, Dnyaneshwar's brother (Note: Dnyaneshwar)		Revananath, the 7th or 8th Navnath, also known as Kada Siddha					Siddhagiri Math c.q. Kaneri Math (est. 7th or 14th century; Lingayat Parampara c.q. Kaadasiddheshwar Parampara	
	Dnyaneshwar (Note: Nisargadatta Maharaj Disciples) (1275–1296) also known as Sant Jñāneshwar or Jñanadeva (Note: Nisargadatta Maharaj Disciples) and as Kadasiddha (Note: Frydman 1987) or Kad-Siddheshwar Maharaj (Note: Boucher)							Siddhagiri Math c.q. Kaneri Math (est. 7th or 14th century; Lingayat Parampara c.q. Kaadasiddheshwar Parampara	
Different accounts: Kadasiddha, (Note: Frydman 1987) also called "Almighty "Kadsiddeshwar", (Note: Ranjit Maharaj Timeline) who appeared as a vision to Sri Gurulingajangam Maharaj (Note: Ranjit Maharaj Timeline) or The 22nd or 24th (Note: Siddhagiri Math (website siddhagirimath.org)) Shri Samarth Muppin Kaadsiddheswar Maharaj, who initiated Sri Gurulingajangam Maharaj (Note: Siddhagiri Math (website siddhagirimath.org)) or "The 25th generation of the kadsiddha at siddhagiri had then initiated Guruling jangam maharaj of nimbargi." (Note: Kada Siddha (website Balkrushna Maharaj)) or "Juangam Maharaj" c.q. "a yogi [at Siddhagiri] who gave [Nimabargi Maharaj] a mantra and told him to meditate regularly on it" (Note: Boucher)
1	Nimbargi Maharaj (1789–1875) also known as Guru Lingam-Jangam Maharaj (Note: Boucher) (Note: Nimbargi Maharj (website Ranade Maharaj) (Note: Frydman 1987)							23rd Shri Samarth Muppin Kaadsiddheswar Maharaj	
2	Shri Bhausaheb Maharaj Umdikar (Note: Boucher) (Note: Bhausaheb Maharaj (website Ganapatrao Maharj)) (1843 Umdi – 1914 Inchgiri (Note: Bhausaheb Maharaj (website Ranade Maharaj)))							24th Shri Samarth Muppin Kaadsiddheswar Maharaj	
3	Shri Amburao Maharaj of Jigjivani (1857 Jigajevani – 1933 Inchgiri) (Note: Amburao Maharaj (website Ranade Maharaj)) (Note: Frydman 1987)	Shivalingavva Akka (1867–1930) (Note: Shivalingavva Akka (website Ranade Maharaj))	Girimalleshwar Maharaj (Note: Frydman 1987) (Note: Girimalleshwar Maharaj (website Balkrushnamauli Maharaj))			Sri Siddharameshwar Maharaj (1875–1936) (Note: Boucher) (Note: Frydman 1987)		25th Shri Samarth Muppin Kaadsiddheswar Maharaj	
4	Shri Gurudev Ranade of Nimbal (1886–1957) (Note: Amburao Maharaj Maharj (website Ranade Maharaj)) (Note: Ranade Maharaj (website Ranade Maharaj)) (Note: Boucher) (Note: Frydman 1987) (Note: Ranade Maharj (website Bridge-India))		Balkrishna Maharaj (Note: Balkrishna Maharaj (website Balkrishna Maharaj))	Shri Aujekar Laxman Maharaj (Note: Nagnath Alli Maharaj (website))	Madhavananda Prabhuji (d. 25th May, 1980) (Note: Madhavananda Prabhuji (website gurusfeet.com))	Sri Nisargadatta Maharaj (1897–1981) (Note: Boucher)	Sri Ranjit Maharaj (1913–2000) (Note: Boucher) (Note: Ranjit Maharaj (website Ranjit Maharaj)) (Note: Ranjit Maharaj Interview) (Note: Ranjit Maharaj Satsang); Sri Ganapatrao Maharaj Kannur (1909–2004) (Note: Bhausaheb Maharaj (website Ganapatrao Maharaj)); Shri Vilasanand Maharaj (1909–1993); Shri Ranachhodray Maharaj, Baitkhol Karwar	26th Shri Muppin Kaadsiddheshwar Maharaj (1905–2001) Student of Sri Siddharameshwar Maharaj (Note: Kaadsiddheshwar Maharaj (website Kaadsiddheshwar Maharaj))	
5	Shri Gurudev Chandra Bhanu Pathak (Note: Ranjit Maharaj (website Angelfire))		Bhausaheb Maharaj (Nandeshwar) (Note: Bhausaheb Maharaj (Nandeshwar) (website Balkrishna Maharaj))	Shri Nagnath Alli Maharaj (Note: Nagnath Alli Maharaj (website Nagnath Alli Maharaj))		Maurice Frydman (Note: Nisargadatta Maharaj Disciples); Ramesh Balsekar (Note: Nisargadatta Maharaj Disciples); Gautam Sachdeva (Note: Gautam Sachdeva); Ramakant Maharaj (Note: Ramakant Maharj (website Ramakant Maharaj)); Alexander Smit (Note: Nisargadatta Maharaj Disciples); Douwe Tiemersma (Note: Nisargadatta Maharaj Disciples); Robert Powell (Note: Nisargadatta Maharaj Disciples); Timothy Conway (Note: Nisargadatta Maharaj Disciples); Jean Dunn (Note: Nisargadatta Maharaj Disciples) (Note: Jean Dunn (website Ed Muzika)) (Note: Jean Dunn (website Ngeton)); Mark McCloskey (Note: Nisargadatta Maharaj Disciples); "Sailor" Bob Adamson (Note: Nisargadatta Maharaj Disciples) (Note: Sailor Bob Adamson (website Sailor Bob Adamson)); Stephen Wolinksky (Note: Nisargadatta Maharaj Disciples); Mark West (Note: Nisargadatta Maharaj Disciples); David Hargrove (Note: Nisargadatta Maharaj Disciples)		27th head: Adrushya Kadsiddheshwar Swamiji (Note: Siddhagiri Math – History (website siddhagirimath.org)	Jagadguru Ramanandacharya Shree Swami Narendracharyaji Maharaj (Note: Narendracharyaji Maharaj (website Narendracharyaji Maharaj))
Notes for table Notes Sources: Boucher, Cathy (2002), The Lineage of Nine Gurus. The Navnath Sampradaya and Sri Nisargadatta Maharaj; Frydman, Maurice (1987), Navanath Sampradaya. In: I Am That. Sri Nisargadatta Maharaj, Bombay: Chetana; Websites: Amburao Maharaj (website Ranade Maharaj): Gurudev R.D. Ranade, Sadguru Shri Amburao Maharaj Archived 2008-07-22 at the Wayback Machine; Balkrishna Maharaj (website Balkrishna Maharaj): balkrushnamauli.com, Samarth Sadguru Balkrushna Maharaj; Bhausaheb Maharaj (website Ranade Maharaj): Gurudev R.D. Ranade, Sadguru Shri Bhausaheb Maharaj Umdikar; Bhausaheb Maharaj (website Ganapatrao Maharaj): ShantiKuteer Ashram, Bhausaheb Maharaj; Bhausaheb Maharaj (Nandeshwar) (website Balkrishna Maharaj): balkrushnamauli.com, Shri Bhausaheb Maharaj (Nandeshwar); Dnyaneshwar: V. V. Shirvaikar, A brief biography of saint Dnyaneshwar (Jnanadeva); Gautam Sachdeva: gautamsachdeva.com, About Gautam Sachdeva; Girimalleshwar Maharaj (website Balkrushnamauli Maharaj): balkrushnamauli.com, Girimalleshwar Maharaj; Jean Dunn (website Ed Muzika): Jean Dunn and Nisargadatta Maharaj; Jean Dunn (website Ngeton): Ngeton, Navnath Masters; Kaadsiddheshwar Maharaj (website Kaadsiddheshwar Maharaj): Mazad Sad Guru, Biography; Kaadsiddheshwar Maharaj Parampara: mazasadguru.com, The Kaadsiddheshwar Parampara; Kada Siddha (website Ranade Maharaj): Gurudev R.D. Ranade, Kada Siddha; Kada Siddha (website Balkrushna Maharaj): Balkrushna Maharaj, Kadsiddheshwar Maharaj; Madhavananda Prabhuji (website gurusfeet.com)Gurus Feet, Madhavananda Prabhuji; Nagnath Alli Maharaj (website Nagnath Alli Maharaj): Shri S.S. Nagnath Alli Maharaj Sansthan, About us; Narendracharyaji Maharaj (website Narendracharyaji Maharaj): A brief biography of Jagadguru Ramanandacharya Sri Swami Narendracharyaji Maharaj; Nimbargi Maharaj (website Ranade Maharaj): Gurudev R.D. Ranade, Sadguru Shri Guruling Jangam Maharaj; Nisargadatta Maharaj Commemorations pt.1: David Godman, Remembering Nisargadatta Maharaj pt.1; Nisargadatta Maharaj Disciples: Advaita Vision, Navnath Sampradaya. Disciples of Nisargadatta Maharaj; Ramakant Maharaj (website Ramakant Maharaj): Shri Ramakant Maharaj, Information; Ranade Maharaj (website Ranade Maharaj): Gurudev R.D. Ranade, Shri Gurudev R. D. Ranade; Ranade Maharaj (website Bridge-India): Bridge-India, Shri Gurudev R.D. Ranade; Ranjit Maharaj (website Ranjit Maharaj): Sadguru.com, Shri Ranjit Maharaj; Ranjit Maharaj Timeline: Sadguru.com, Shri Ranjit Maharaj History; Ranjit Maharaj Interview: InnerQuest, Ranjit interview; Ranjit Maharaj Satsang: inner-quest.org, "Final Reality has no beginning and no end."; Ranjit Maharaj (website Angelfire): Sri Ranjit Maharaj profile; Sailor Bob Adamson (website Sailor Bob Adamson): Sailor Bob Adamson website; Shivalingavva Akka (website Ranade Maharaj): gurudevranade.com, Rv. Smt.Shri.Shivalingavva Akka; Siddhagiri Math: Detailed history of Shri Nisarghadatta Maharaj; Siddhagiri Math (website Shri Kshetra Siddhagiri Math, Kaneri): Shri Kshetra Siddhagiri Math, Kaneri; Siddhagiri Math (Gramjivan Museum): Siddhagiri Gramjivan Museum Kaneri Math; Siddhagiri Math (website siddhagirimath.org): siddhagirimath.org, Siddhagiri Math – Pedigree; Siddhagiri Math – History (website siddhagirimath.org): siddhagirimath.org, Siddhagiri Math – History

== Publications ==
- The Way Of The Bird
- Illusion v. Reality (2011), Sadguru Publishing. ISBN 9780615156033.
- My Masters voice : Edited by Linda Flames, Compiled by : Murli Raghvan and Translated by Sachin Kshirsagar, Marathi Version Name : Mazya Sadgurunchi Amrutwani
- Marathi Book : माझ्या सद्गुरूंची अमृतवाणी : मराठी अनुवाद : सचिन क्षीरसागर
