= Jagadguru Ramanandacharya Narendracharya =

Indian spiritual leader

Ramanandacharya Narendracharya
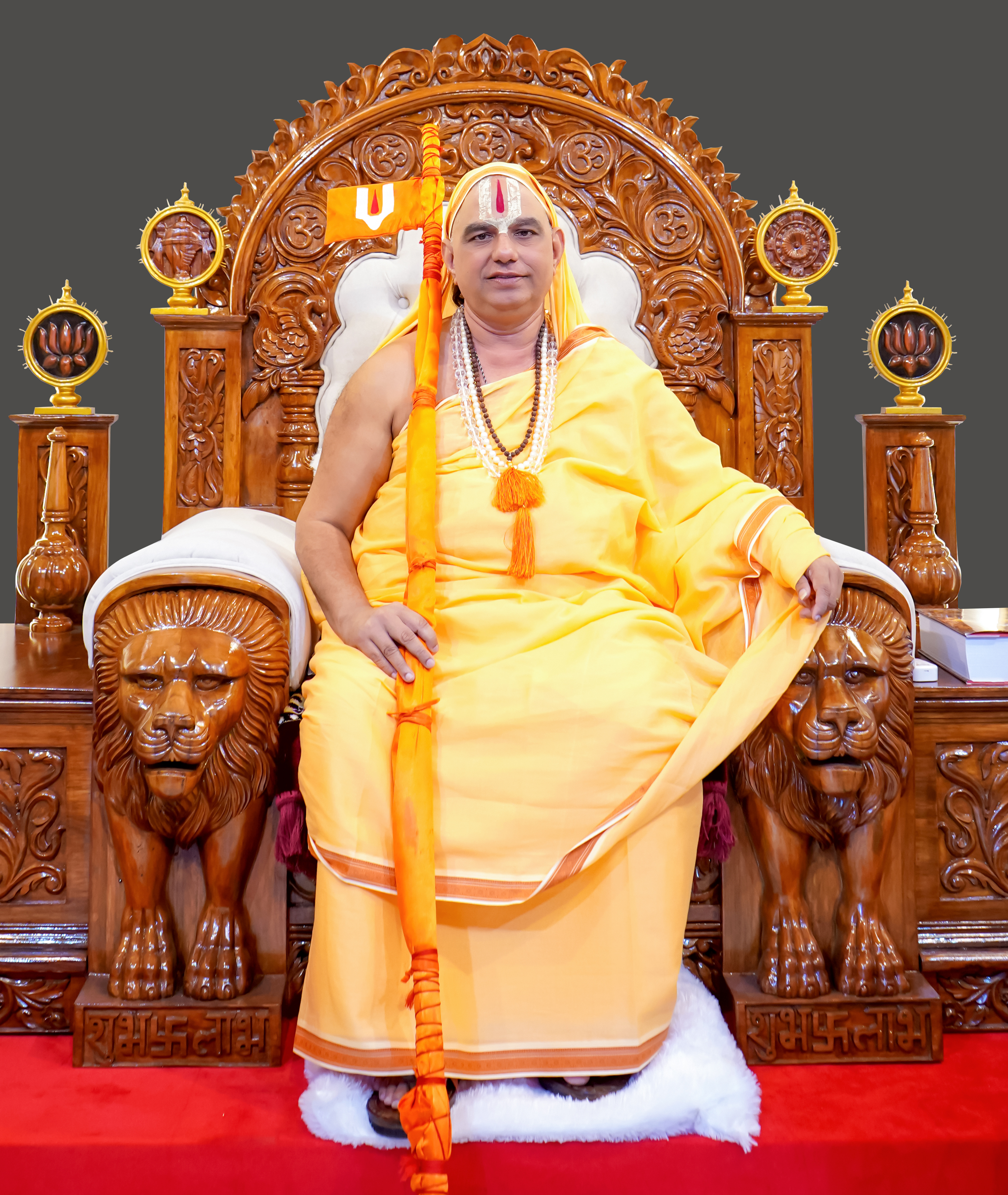
- Ramanandacharya Narendracharya in 2025
- Title: Jagadguru Ramanandacharya

Personal life
- Born: 21 October 1966 (age 59) Nanij, Ratnagiri district, Maharashtra, India

Religious life
- Religion: Hinduism

Religious career
- Teacher: Samarth Sadguru Kadsiddheshwar Maharaj
- Awards: International Peace Honour, Veer Savarkar Award, Indian Red Cross Society Award

Ramanandacharya Narendracharya is an Indian spiritual leader and the head of the Ramanandacharya Dakshin Peeth located at Nanijdham, Ratnagiri district, Maharashtra. He is recognized as a successor of the Adi Jagadguru Ramanandacharya and a key figure in the Ramananda tradition of Vaishnavism.

He was conferred the title of Jagadguru Ramanandacharya on 21 October 2005, in an event organized with the participation of Vaishnava Akhadas, sub-Akhadas, the four principal Sampradayas, and Khalsa branches under the Akhil Bharatiya Akhara Parishad. The conferment recognized his contributions toward promoting the practice of Ramanama Bhakti and spreading the teachings of the Ramanandi tradition in southern India.

== Birth and Early Life ==
Narendracharya was born on 21 October 1966 in the village of Nanij, Ratnagiri district, Maharashtra, India, on the occasion of Ashwin Shuddha Ashtami during the Navaratri festival. Narendracharya was born to Subhadra, a devotee of Shri Dattatreya Maharaj, and Baburao Govindrao Surve, a descendant of the Suryavanshi (Solar Dynasty) belonging to the Vasishtha gotra.

From a young age, Swami Narendracharya showed a strong inclination toward spiritual practice and devotion, particularly to Shri Dattatreya, influenced by his mother, Subhadra. One account has him engrossed in meditation while a little scorpion traversed his body, exemplifying his capacity for sustained concentration.

In the fifth grade, he started the village's public Datta Jayanti ceremony, which continues at Nanij Dham. Narendracharya Ji and his colleagues celebrated Holi from Phalguna Shuddha Panchami to Purnima at the age of ten or eleven, unlike other Konkan adults. Nanij's children's Holi tradition reflects his early community organizing.

== Education ==
During his school years, Swami Narendracharya showed a particular interest in subjects such as mathematics, science, and history. His proficiency in mathematics later influenced his approach to disseminating spiritual knowledge and organizing social service using Information technology (IT).

Under his guidance, a team of approximately 150 to 200 IT professionals has developed multiple software systems based on his conceptual designs. Reports indicate that he personally contributed to the core logic of a majority of these systems.

== Spiritual Journey & Leadership ==
Shri Gajanan Maharaj of Shegaon is the presiding deity worshipped by Swami Narendracharya, a spiritual teacher known for his teachings on Brahman-consciousness. Accounts of his life indicate that this guidance played a significant role in shaping his spiritual path and approach to renunciation. Swami Narendracharya gradually became a focal point for devotees seeking spiritual guidance and practical advice. Individuals approached him with personal and social concerns, and his counsel was noted for being clear and practical.

Over time, a community of followers formed around him, engaging in collective devotional practices such as samuhik bhajans (group devotional singing) and namasmaran (chanting the divine name). In 1989, the Prakat Din Utsav (Manifestation Day) of Shri Gajanan Maharaj was celebrated for the first time at his residence.

=== Initiation and Spiritual Lineage ===
On 30 January 1991, Narendracharya accepted Samarth Sadguru Kadsiddheshwar Maharaj as his spiritual Guru and received initiation (diksha) into a recognized spiritual lineage. This lineage, known as the Inchgiri Sampradaya or Nimbarkacharya Guru Parampara, traces its origins to Revan Siddhanath, one of the Navnath Siddhas and a disciple of Bhagwan Dattatreya.

The lineage was subsequently passed through several teachers, including Narayanrao (Guru Ling Jangam Maharaj), Raghunathpriya Maharaj (Tanjavur, Tamil Nadu), Bhausaheb Maharaj (Umadi – Inchgiri), and Samarth Sadguru Siddharameshwar Maharaj (Pathri, Solapur). The tradition continued with Samarth Muppin Kadsiddheshwar Maharaj, the 26th Acharya and spiritual head of Kaneri Math, Kolhapur. Under his guidance, Swami Narendracharya formally entered this spiritual lineage.

=== Foundation of the Ashram and the Sw-Swaroop Sampradaya ===
In April 1991, Narendracharya established an ashram on his ancestral land in Nanij, Maharashtra, with the aim of promoting devotional practice (bhakti marga) and offering spiritual instruction.

On 24 February 1992, he formally founded the Sw-Swaroop Sampradaya, a spiritual movement encouraging self-realization and social responsibility. Its guiding message, “Tumhi jaga, dusryala jagava” (“Live nobly and inspire others to do the same”), emphasizes personal growth and collective welfare.

=== Teachings and Philosophy ===
Narendracharya’s teachings highlight service, education, and the preservation of Hindu cultural and spiritual traditions. Narendracharya emphasizes ethical living, social responsibility, and spiritual discipline as core principles of human life. His central message, “Live nobly and inspire others to do the same,” reflects his belief that personal conduct should align with moral and spiritual ideals. According to his teachings, human life represents an opportunity for self-realization and spiritual union with the divine (Sayujya Mukti).He emphasizes compassion toward marginalized groups as a spiritual duty and advocates for truthfulness, discipline, and selfless service (seva).

His philosophy is summarized in three guiding principles (Trisutri): 1. Keep your eyes scientific. 2. Keep your mind spiritual. 3. Keep your intellect realistic.

This framework is intended to encourage individuals to balance faith, intellect, and practicality in daily life. He teaches that sadhana (spiritual practice), service (seva), and ethical conduct (acharana) together form the foundation of a meaningful life.

Narendracharya oversees religious, educational, and social programs through institutions associated with his ashram. His initiatives focus on education, environmental awareness, administrative organization, literature, and humanitarian service across Maharashtra and Goa.

== Association with Akhada Parishad ==
During the Nashik Kumbh Mela in 2003, Narendracharya's spiritual and social activities were noted by several senior saints. Mahant Gyandas Maharaj, then President of the Akhil Bharatiya Shad-Darshan Akhada Parishad, invited him to join the traditional lineage of sadhus.

On 11 April 2004, at the Ujjain Kumbh Mela, he was formally accepted as a disciple of the Nirvani Akhada and given the name Mahant Narendradās. Observing the absence of an independent Vaishnava religious seat in South India and recognizing his leadership within the community, members of the Vaishnava Akhadas proposed his elevation as Jagadguru Ramanandacharya to facilitate the broader propagation of Vaishnavism and devotional practices.

On 21 October 2005, a coronation ceremony was held in Ayodhya, during which Mahant Narendradās was formally anointed as Jagadguru Ramanandacharya Narendracharya. The ceremony was attended by Mahant Gyandas Maharaj, members of the Akhada Parishad, representatives of the Nirvani, Nirmohi, and Digambar Akhadas along with their sub-Akhadas, heads of the Chatusampradaya, office-bearers of Vaishnava Khalsas, and representatives from Udasin, Bada Udasin, and Nirmal Akhadas.

=== Contribution within the Ramanandi Tradition ===
Narendracharya, a contemporary figure in the Ramanandi tradition, has contributed to the dissemination of religious knowledge (dharma-jnana) and the promotion of spiritual awareness in society. To make scriptural education and theological studies more accessible, he has established several monasteries (mathas). These institutions have developed beyond their original role as centres of worship, functioning also as centres for knowledge, spiritual practice, and cultural education.

Through these initiatives, the study of sacred scriptures has been extended from a specialised pursuit of scholars into an aspect of everyday devotional life. In response to contemporary contexts, Narendracharya has combined scriptural study with elements of spiritual science and formulated an organised framework of worship and practice.

Alongside his religious work, Narendracharya has promoted inclusivity within the practice of devotion, without distinctions based on caste, class, gender, or social status. In his teachings, surrender (prapatti) is presented as open to all, and devotion is framed as achievable for every individual, not limited to ascetics or scholars.

=== Establishment of the Southern Peeth ===
On the same occasion, Nanij was designated as Ramanandacharya Dakshin Peeth – Nanij Dham, serving as the southern spiritual seat of Adi Jagadguru Ramanandacharya.

The Three Principal Seats of Adi Jagadguru Ramanandacharya

1. Shri Math – Panchganga Ghat, Varanasi
2. Tulsi Peeth – Chitrakoot, Madhya Pradesh
3. Ramanandacharya Dakshin Peeth – Nanij Dham, Maharashtra

== Work and Community Initiatives ==
Under Narendracharya’s guidance, several religious, educational, and social institutions operate across India, including the Jagadguru Narendracharya Maharaj Sansthan and the Sanjeevan Trust. These organizations conduct programs in the areas of education, health, social welfare, environmental awareness, and spiritual instruction.

=== Education ===
Free English-medium schools and colleges affiliated with CBSE board have been established to provide access to education for children from rural and economically weaker backgrounds.. Traditional Vedic Pathshalas operate under the Sansthan, offering instruction in the Vedas and priestly training. These are open to students from all sections of society. Separate institutions have also been established for girls, promoting Vedic education and women’s participation in religious and social activities.

=== Social Reform ===
Narendracharya’s organizations have undertaken campaigns against social issues such as superstition. Community groups like Yuva Sena and Mahila Sena have been formed to promote youth involvement, women’s empowerment, and civic awareness. Programs encouraging Ghar Wapsi (reconversion to Hinduism) and inter-community marriages have been reported as part of efforts toward social integration and the preservation of cultural identity.

=== Healthcare and Humanitarian Services ===
The Sansthan operates a network of free ambulance services and organizes medical camps in collaboration with healthcare professionals. Activities include blood-donation drives During crises such as floods,droughts, and the COVID-19 pandemic., affiliated centers have distributed food, medicines, and essential supplies Relief efforts have also extended to the provision of mobility aids and economic support to persons with disabilities and low-income families.

=== Environmental and Sustainability Programs ===
Environmental protection is a recurring focus of Narendracharya’s community work. Since the early 2000s, the annual Vasundhara Paayidindi foot march has been organized to raise awareness about climate change and sustainable living. Initiatives have included tree plantation, water conservation, renewable energy adoption, and waste management projects. Sub-centres under the Sansthan have reported implementing “Net Zero” programs to reduce environmental impact. A “Green Village” campaign aims to promote environmentally sustainable practices in rural areas.

=== Cultural and Spiritual Activities ===
Regular religious and cultural gatherings are organized at Nanijdham Dakshin Peeth and its affiliated centers across India. Events include devotional singing, scriptural discourses, and public celebrations such as Wari festivals and Hindu New Year processions. The Sansthan also conducts weekly online satsangs and publishes a monthly magazine titled Dharmakshetra Nanij Dham, featuring articles on spirituality, culture, and social issues.

Mass spiritual initiation ceremonies (diksha) are held periodically, during which devotees receive guidance on devotional practice and moral conduct. Pilgrimage assistance programs, such as the Maa Narmada Parikrama service, provide food and accommodation for devotees undertaking long religious journeys.

=== Preservation of Spiritual and Cultural Heritage ===
As part of efforts to preserve Vedic and Sanatan heritage, the Sansthan has organized various initiatives during large religious gatherings such as the Kumbh Mela. These activities have included health and emergency service camps, cleanliness drives, food distribution for pilgrims, and awareness programs related to cultural and religious practices.

=== Religious Awareness and Publications ===
Under Narendracharya’s guidance, a monthly magazine titled Dharmakshetra Nanij Dham is published by the Sansthan. The publication features articles on Indian culture, history, ethics, and religious traditions, with the stated aim of promoting awareness of Sanatan Dharma and cultural education among readers.

=== Body and Organ Donation Initiatives ===
In 2016, Narendracharya initiated a campaign encouraging voluntary posthumous body donation for medical education and research. According to reports from affiliated institutions, over 56,000 applications were submitted to government medical colleges following the campaign’s launch, and several body donations have since been carried out through this initiative.

In February 2025, the Sansthan introduced a related campaign promoting organ donation, including the donation of eyes, skin, and other organs after death. The program received widespread participation, and reports indicate that a number of successful organ donations were completed as part of the effort.

=== Literary Contributions ===
Narendracharya is credited with several literary works, including Shri Leelamrit, a poetic composition of over 3,000 verses written in 18 days. His writings, which include poetry, treatises, and devotional literature, focus on moral values and spiritual growth. The publications under his guidance aim to make religious concepts accessible to a general audience.

== Legacy ==
Narendracharya is regarded by followers as a spiritual leader who integrates religious philosophy with social welfare. His initiatives span education, healthcare, environmental protection, and technology-based community development. Independent and regional reports have described his work as combining traditional religious instruction with modern social engagement, contributing to both spiritual and humanitarian causes.

== Bibliography ==
- "Goveshwar Mahimasanhita", 2026, ISBN 978-81-998252-8-4, 978-81-998252-3-9, 978-81-998252-5-3, Language: Marathi, Hindi, English
- "Bhakti Ka Balsakha", 2026, ISBN 978-81-998252-7-7, 978-81-998252-4-6, Language: Marathi, Hindi
- "Childhood Companion of Devotion", 2026, ISBN 978-81-998252-1-5, Language: English
- "Shree Lilamrut", 2026, ISBN 978-81-998252-2-2, 978-81-998252-9-1, Language: Marathi, Hindi
- "Bhartiya Kutumb Jeevanshastra", 2026, ISBN 978-81-686-7069-3, Language: Marathi
- "Bhartiya Parivar Jeevanshastra", 2026, ISBN 978-81-686706-7-9, Language: Hindi
- "The Science of Indian Family Life", 2026, ISBN 978-81-686-7066-2, Language: English
- "Sanatan Panth Shastra", 2026, ISBN 978-81-998252-6-0, 978-81-686-7061-7, 978-81-686-7062-4, Language: Marathi, Hindi, English

== Honours and awards ==
- 2025 State-Level Blood Donor Excellence Award Conferred again by the Maharashtra State Blood Transfusion Council.
- 2025 Maratha Samajratna Award Awarded by the Akhil Bharatiya Maratha Mahasangh.
- 2025 Indian Red Cross Society Award Presented by Jishnu Dev Varma, Governor of Telangana, on World Blood Donor Day.
- International Peace Honour 2012 Awarded by J.N.M.G. Foundation Inc., USA, presented by Edward P. Mangano, Executive of Nassau County; acknowledged by a resolution of the New Jersey General Assembly.

== Personal life ==
During the period, his interest in secular work, including a government job, declined. In keeping with social conventions, his parents arranged his marriage on 15 October 1985 to Shobhana Rasal (born 2 June 1968), who later became known as Supriya Narendra Surve. The couple had a son, Kanifnath, born on 24 October 1988.
