= Revannath =

Shri Revan Natha, also known as Revan Siddh, Kada Siddha, and, Kaadhsiddheshwar Siddharaj was the 7th or 8th Navnath. He is especially worshipped in western India, where several temples are dedicated to him, and several sampradayas trace their origin to him, the best-known being the Inchegeri Sampradaya.

== Etymology ==
=== Kada Siddha ===
According to one account, Revan nath derived the name Kada Siddha from his siddhi, powers:

A woman [called "maiee"] was against all saints in "karver" province. She used to trouble the saints who had acquired Siddhi (God gifted powers) and hence Revananath was requested by his disciple (Marul Siddha) to stop Maiee by using powers given to Revananath by Shree Datta. Revananath accepted this request, [and] converted "maiee" to a musical instrument, which is said that, he used to play until his death. Due to his very kind heart [and] great powers with which he stopped "maiee", people started to call him Kada Siddha.

=== Kaadhsiddheshwar ===
According to another account, Revanath settled on the Siddhgiri hill for ascetic practice, living on whatever the jungle, gave him. He became famous known as Kaadsiddheswar

- "Kaadha" means a jungle;
- siddha, siddha guru, mean "one who is accomplished";
- "ishwar" means Shiva, the "Supreme lord".

Meaning "the one who attained supreme realization in a forest".

== Biography ==
Revan Nath was born at the bank of Reva River (Narmada River ), and was brought up at a farmer’s house.

=== Mahima Siddhi ===
One morning when he proceeded to his farm, Lord Guru Dattatreya gave him Darshana, revealing himself to Revan Natha. Guru Dattatreya recognised the boy as an Avatara being incarnated on earth and gave him special siddhi, divine powers, called "Mahima". After receiving this siddhi, the farmer’s house flourished with plenty of food grain and prosperity, and Anna Chatra was also started.

Machchindra Natha, the first Nath of the Navnath Sampradaya, visited the village when he came to know about Mahima Siddhi. Machchindra Natha recognised Revan Natha as a Narayana Avatar but warned that if he kept stuck in a cage of popularity due to this Mahima Siddhi, it would create an obstacle in his Avatar Karya. Machchindra Natha prayed to Lord Dattatreya to give the status of Brahma Sanatana to this boy. Revan Natha realised his Satya Swaroopa, and proceeded to work for the welfare of the world, and the upliftment of poor and needy people.

=== The seven dead children ===
While on pilgrimage, he arrived at a village named Vita (near Sangli, in Maharashtra). At that time, there was a naming ceremony occurring for a Brahmin family from the village; the patriarch of the family, upon seeing Revan Natha, cordially invited him to the ceremony, which happened to be for his son. Revan Natha accepted and decided to stay at the Brahmin’s residence for a while, seeing his good nature and respectful manner. However, that night, at the stroke of midnight, the son whose ceremony it had been suddenly expired. The mother of the dead child began weeping, upon discovering this; Revan Natha, woken by the sound, got up to investigate and—meeting the father, who was also stricken by grief—asked the latter what had occurred. The Brahmin man explained to the saint that the recently deceased had been his seventh son—and the seventh child of his to die upon completion of the naming ceremony.

After listening to the story, Revan Natha thought to himself: "How could such a thing have occurred when I myself was in the house?—and perceived nothing out of the ordinary!" After consoling the grieving family, Revan Natha straightaway approached Lord Shiva, and brought the immortal consciousnesses (sanjivan chaitanya) of the seven dead children therefrom; he divided the body of the boy who had died the previous night, and, reinstating the awarenesses (chaitanya) therein, made alive the seven dead children and gave them rebirth by using his spiritual power. The Brahmin family—no longer weeping with grief, but with joy—showered the sage with praise and gratitude; Shri Revan Natha thence stayed in the village for some days more, thereafter proceeding on his pilgrimage for divine duties (i.e., looking after the welfare of needy people).

== Temples ==
Several temples are dedicated to Revan Nath.

=== Siddhagiri Math ===
Revananath is considered to have established the Kaadsiddheshwar temple and math in the 7th century CE. Other accounts mention a history of "more than 1300 years", and the 14th century CE, when a Lingayat Priest established a Shivling at the hill, which became Kaneri Math.

It is located on Siddhagiri hill in Kanheri village, Karveer tehsil, Kolhapur district, Maharashtra state, India. It is also called "Siddhagiri Math" The Siddhagiri Math was established around the Moola-Kaadsiddheswar Shiva temple in the Shaiva-Lingayat tradition. It is a vast campus with the central Shiva temple.

In the 12th century the Math came under the influence of Basaveshwar, who established the Lingayat tradition of south India. Nowadays the influence of the math exceeds to most of the districts of Maharashtra and Karnataka, and also to some places in Madhya Pradesh and Andhra Pradesh.

Part of Siddhagiri Math is the "Siddhagiri Gramjivan Museum", a wax museum dedicated to Gandhi's ideal of rural life. It was established by the 27th Mathadhipati, H.H. Adrushya Kadsiddheshwar Swami Ji.

Waarshik Maha Utsava (Annual Ceremony) is being celebrated continuously for 3 days over here and the said practice is observed in Revan Natha Darbar Kolhapur since 33 years regularly with all joy.

All spiritual rituals of Natha Sampradaya are being arranged. The Annual ceremony comes in Margashirsha, Vadya Ashthami Navami and Dashami as per Hindu calendar which normally comes in the month of December every year as per English calendar.

Besides Annual Maha Utsava, the other important Utsavas like Guru Pornima, Shri Krishnashtami are also celebrated in Revan Natha Darbara enthusiastically. Spiritual guidance is being rendered to the devotees in Revan Natha Darbar Kolhapur.

=== Other temples ===
- Revannath temple located in vita not in renavi
- Sidhhanath Temple, Kharsundi is of a relative recent origin, being built 150 years ago.
- Lord Bhoodsidhhanath Mandir is located in Bhood, Maharashtra.

== Sampradaya ==
=== Inchegeri Sampradaya ===
The Inchegeri Sampradaya honours Revan Natha as the (mythological) founder of their sampradaya.

== See also ==
- Shaivism
- 84 Mahasiddhas

== Sources ==
- Boucher, Cathy, The Lineage of Nine Gurus. The Navnath Sampradaya and Sri Nisargadatta Maharaj
- Dabade, K.B. (1998), Sociology of religion: a case study of Nimbargi Sampradaya, Mangala Publications
- Frydman, Maurice (1987), Navanath Sampradaya. In: I Am That. Sri Nisargadatta Maharaj, Bombay: Chetana
- Nisargadatta (1973), I Am That (PDF), archived from the original (PDF) on 2018-01-27
