= Matsyendranatha =

10th century Hindu and Buddhist saint and yogi

- Macchindranāth, Mīnanātha
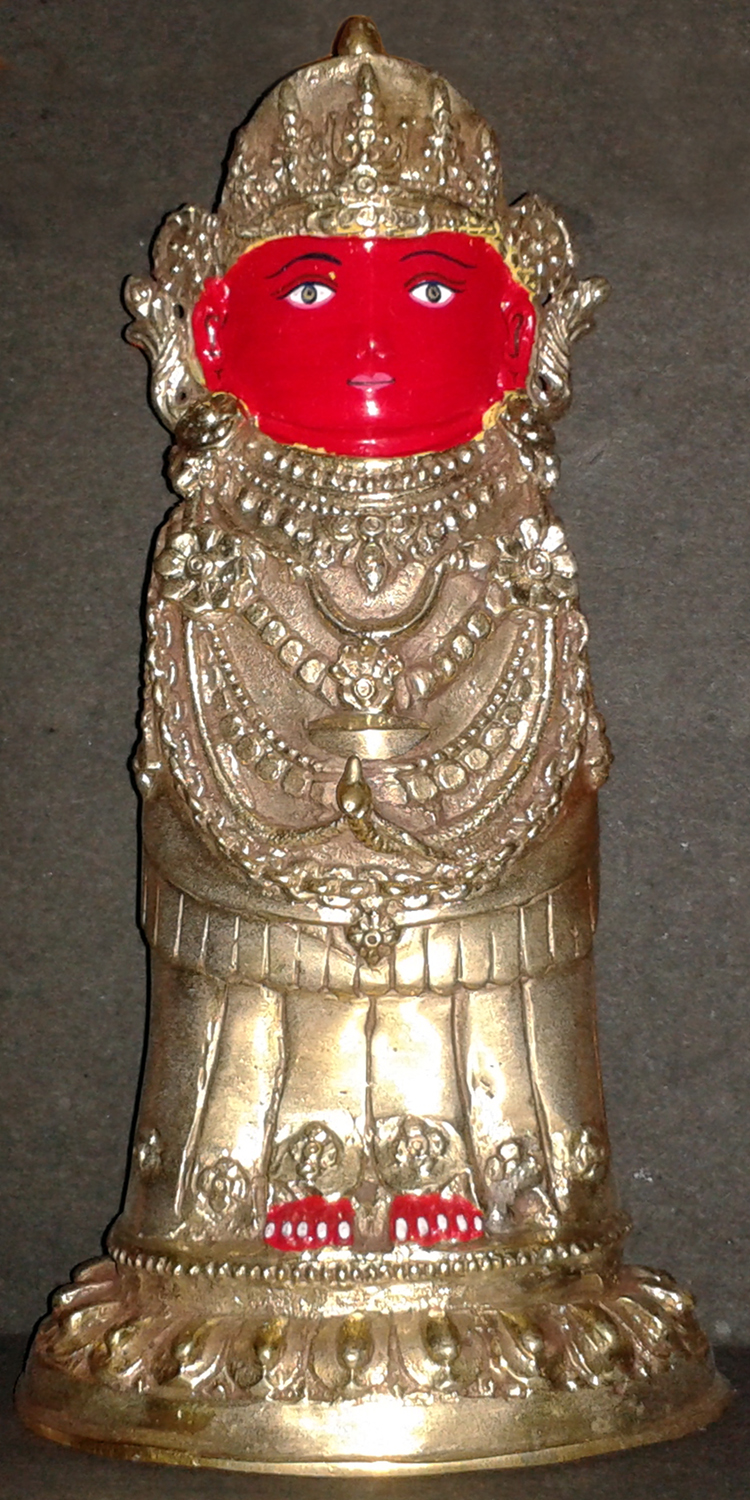
- Miniature statue of Macchindranāth (Bunga Dyah) from Nepal

Personal life
- Born: 10th century c.e Chandradwip, Bengal (now in Barishal, Bangladesh)
- Died: 11th century c.e

Religious life
- Religion: Hinduism, Buddhism
- Founder of: Hatha yoga
- Philosophy: Hatha yoga, Tantra
- Sect: Nath, Kaula, Shaivism

Senior posting
- Disciples: Gorakshanath, Jalandharnath, Kanifnath (Kanhoba), Gahininath, Bhartrinath, Revan Nath, Charpatinath and Naganath
- Kaulajnan-Nirnaya, Akul-Viratantra

Matsyendranātha, also known as Matsyendra, Macchindranāth, Mīnanātha and Minapa (fl. early 10th century) was a saint and yogi in a number of Buddhist and Hindu traditions. He is considered the revivalist of hatha yoga as well as the author of some of its earliest texts. He is also seen as the founder of the natha sampradaya, having received the teachings from Shiva. He is associated with Kaula Shaivism. He is also one of the eighty-four mahasiddhas and considered the guru of Gorakshanath, another known figure in early hatha yoga. He is revered by both Hindus and Buddhists and is sometimes regarded as an incarnation of Avalokiteśvara.

In the Siddhar tradition of Tamil Nadu, Matsyendranatha is revered as one of the 18 Siddhars of yore, and is also known as Machamuni. The Kasi Viswanathar Temple in Thiruparankundram, Madurai, Tamil Nadu is home to his Jiva Samadhi. In Nepal, Matsyendranatha is a highly revered deity, and the largest chariot festival in the world is dedicated to him in the valley of Kathmandu as a Buddhist-Hindu syncretic tradition.

== Early life ==
Little is known about the life of Matsyendranatha: he is also called Minanatha and he is also associated with Lui-pa, all of whose names translate as 'Lord of the Fishes'. Legends vary in describing his birthplace. Giuseppe Tucci states, on the authority of two Tibetan works - the Siddha (Wylie: grub thob) and Taranatha's "Possessing the Seven Transmissions" (Wylie: bka' babs bdun ldan) - that Matsyendranātha, who is seen in Tibet as an avatar of Avalokiteśvara, was a from Kaibarta or fishermen community of Kamarupa. Other sources give his birthplace as Barisal ( then Chandradwip). According to inscriptions found in Nepal in the ancient Newari colony of Bungmati, the home of Machhindranath Chariot Jatra, his shrine was brought from Assam in India. He is mentioned in the Sabaratantra as one of the twenty-four Kapalika Siddhas.

== Legend ==
Legends have it that Matsyendranatha was born under an inauspicious star. This warranted his parents to throw the baby into the ocean. It was there that the baby was swallowed by a fish where he lived for many years. The fish swam to the bottom of the ocean where Shiva was imparting the secrets of yoga to his consort, Parvati. Upon overhearing the secrets of yoga, Matsyendranatha began to practice yoga sadhana inside the fish's belly. After twelve years he emerged as an enlightened Siddha. This is given as the origin of his name 'Lord of the Fishes' or 'He Whose Lord is the Lord of the Fishes'. Other versions of the legend exist, including one in which Matsyendranatha was born as a fish and turned into a Siddha by Shiva. Tibetan renditions of the story tell of a fisherman-turned-Siddha named Mina, who is eaten by a fish while working in the Bay of Bengal. Some scholars draw parallels between this legend and the Biblical story of Jonah and the Whale.

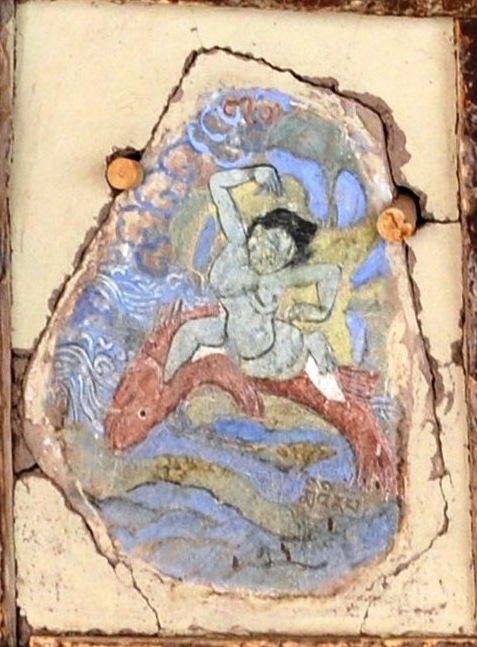
Depiction as Minapa, one of 84 mahasiddhas, Hemis Monastery

Another legend says that, when Gorakshanath visited Patan, in Nepal, he captured all the rain-showering serpents of Patan and started to meditate after he was disappointed by the locals as they did not grant him any alms on his request. As a result, Patan faced drought for a long time. The king of Patan, on the advice of his advisers, invited Matsyendranatha, Gorakshanath's guru, to Patan. When Gorakshanath learned that his teacher was in Patan, he released the rain showering serpents and went to see him. As soon as the rain-showering serpents were set free, Patan again got plenty of rainfall every year. After that day, the locals of Patan worshiped Matsyendranatha as the god of rain.

== Works ==
Matsyendranatha is credited with composing Hatha and Tantric works such as the Kaulajñānanirnāya ("Discussion of the Knowledge Pertaining to the Kaula Tradition"), the Matsyendrasamhita and "Akula-Viratantra", some of the earliest texts on hatha yoga in Sanskrit in the eleventh century. James Mallinson, Alexis Sanderson, David Gordon White and others theorize that many works were attributed to him posthumously.

== Disciples ==
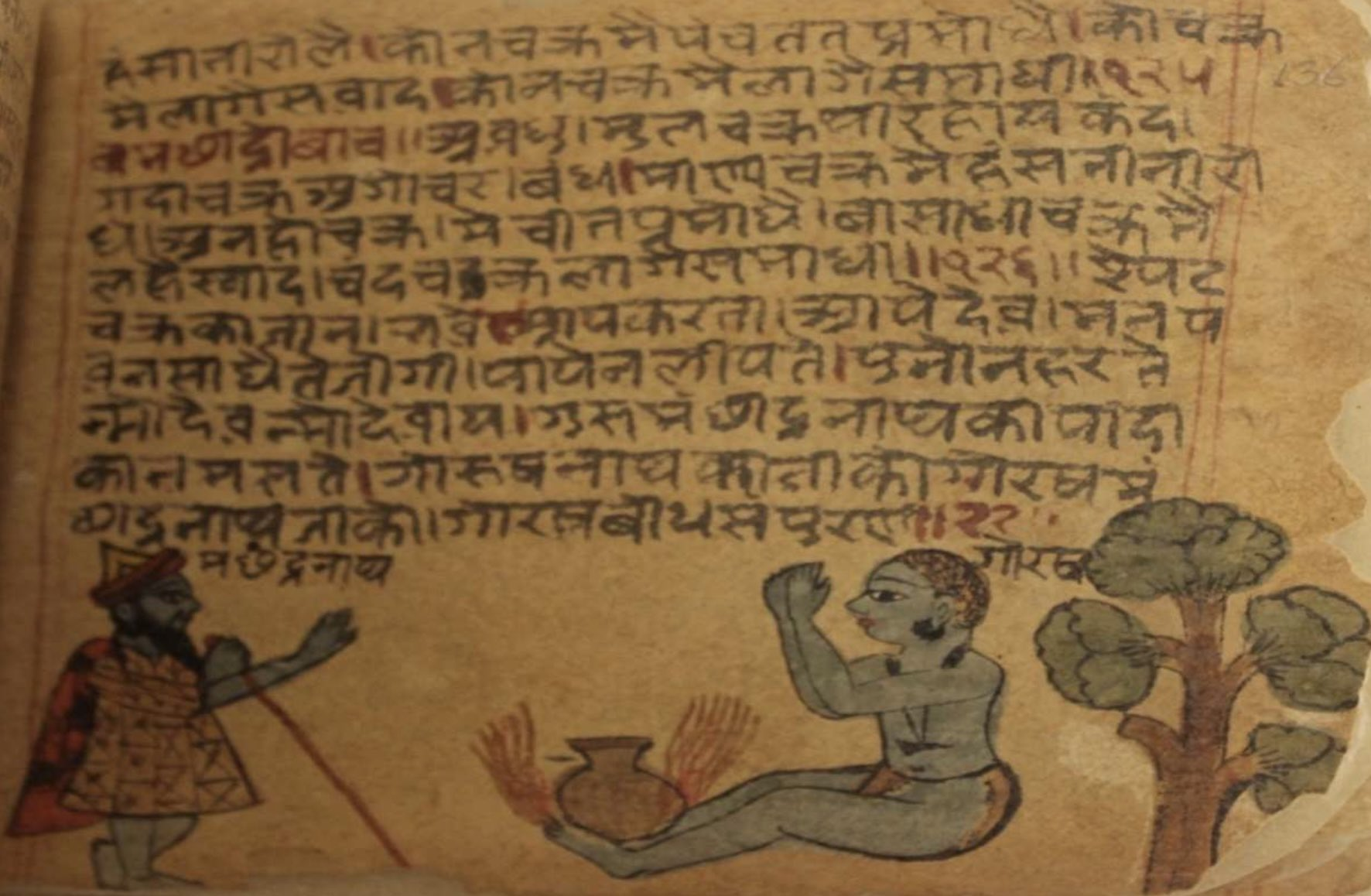
Illustrated manuscript depiction of Gorakhnath and Matsyendranatha, ca.1715

Matsyendranatha is listed as having eight disciples. The list of his disciples varies between different temples and lineages, but includes Gorakshanath, Jalandharnath, Kanifnath (Kanhoba), Gahininath, Bhartri Nath, Revan Nath, Charpatinath and Naganath. Along with Matsyendranatha, they are called the Navnath. While Gorkshanath is considered a direct disciple of Matsyendranatha, it is likely they lived hundreds of years apart.

== In Nepal ==
Macchindranāth (or Bunga Dyah in Newari) is a god of rain worshiped by both Hindus and Buddhists in Nepal. Hindus regard him as an incarnation of Shiva while Buddhists regard him as an incarnation of Avalokiteśvara.The first original temple of Machhindranath is in a place called Bungamati while the second temple Macchindranāth lies in the southern part of the Patan Durbar Square since 1673.

=== Rato Matsyendranatha of Patan, Nepal ===
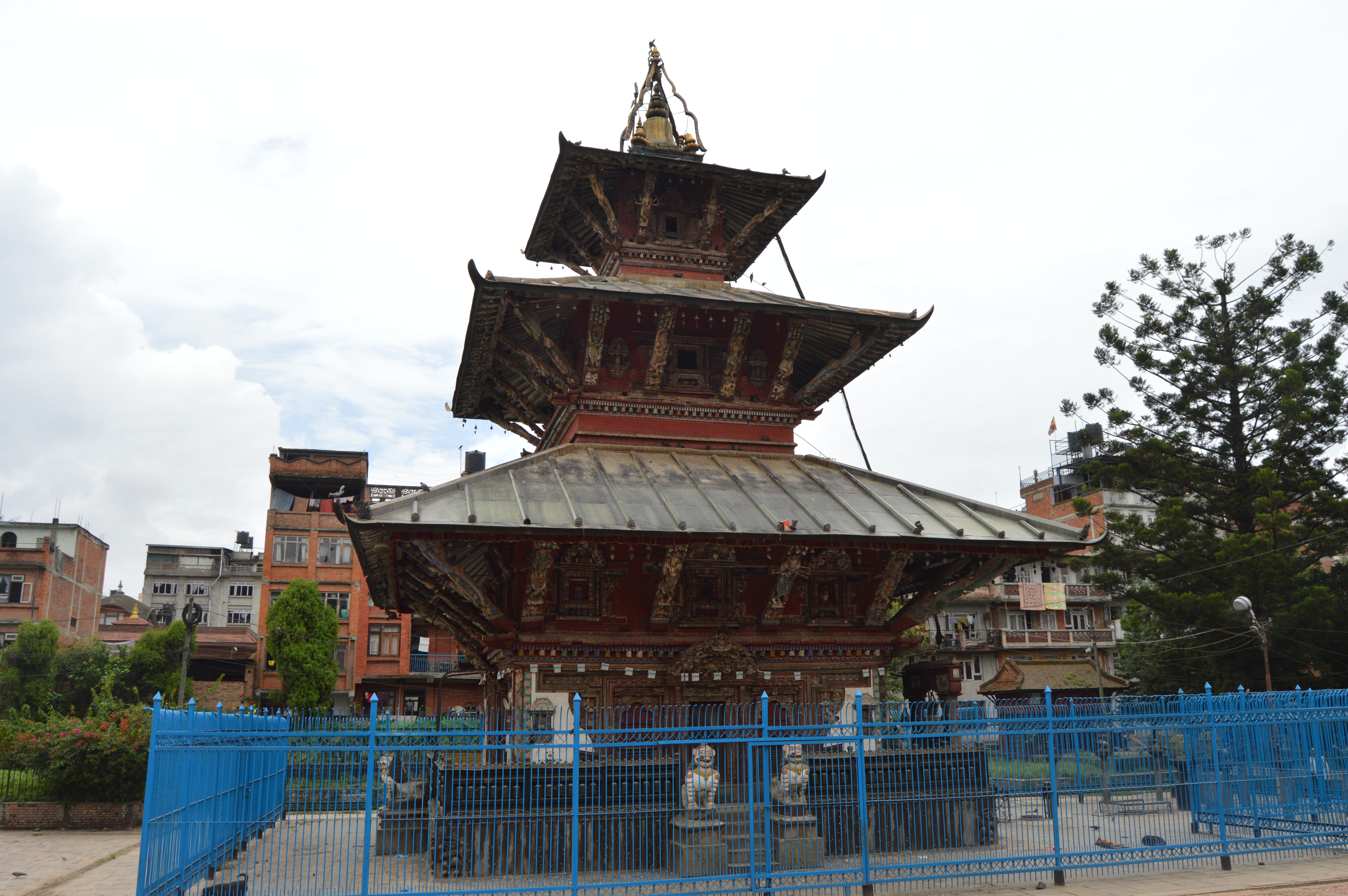
Rato Machhindranath (Red Matsyendranatha) Temple, Nepal

Hyangu (red) Macchindranath temple also known as Temple of Bunga: Dyaa: as it resides in Bungamati and also in Patan, also known as the Rato Macchindranath Temple, is one of the oldest Matsyendranatha temples, dating back from the 16th century. It lies in the southern part of the Patan Durbar Square. Each of the four well-crafted wooden doors of this temple is guarded by two lion figures while the four corners of the temple are guarded by khyah, a yeti-like figure.

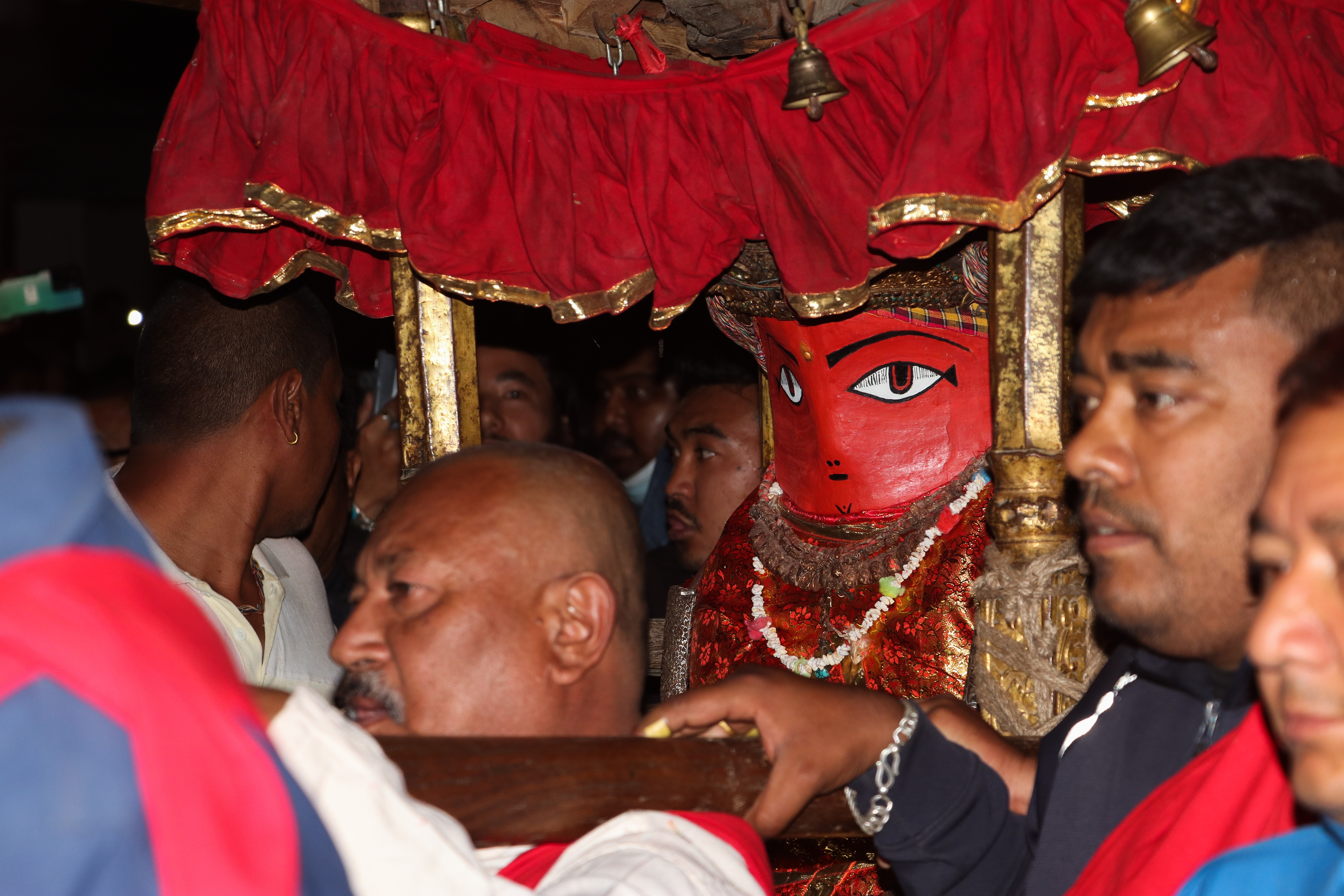
The idol of Rato Machhindranath (Red Matsyendranatha) being carried from the temple to be ascended in the chariot at Pulchowk, Patan, Lalitpur

The murti of Rato Macchindranath (Matsyendranatha) spends six months of the year in this temple. The village of Bungamati, regarded in Nepal as the birthplace of Matsyendranatha, is a traditional Newar town located 10 kilometres (6.2 mi) from downtown Kathmandu. The temple of Rato Macchindranath is located in the heart of this village and it is known as his second home. After the chariot festival, Rato Macchindranath spends the next six months in this temple.

=== Seto Matsyendranatha of Kathmandu, Nepal ===
Toyu (white) Macchindranath temple also known as JanaBaha: Dyaa: as it resides in JanaBaha: in Kathmandu in another important Macchindranath temple in Nepal. White Machhindranath(Matsyendranatha) is also known as Jana-baha Dyo since the temple is located at Jana Baha(Bahal).

=== Bhoto Jatra (भोटो जात्रा)/ Chariot Festival ===
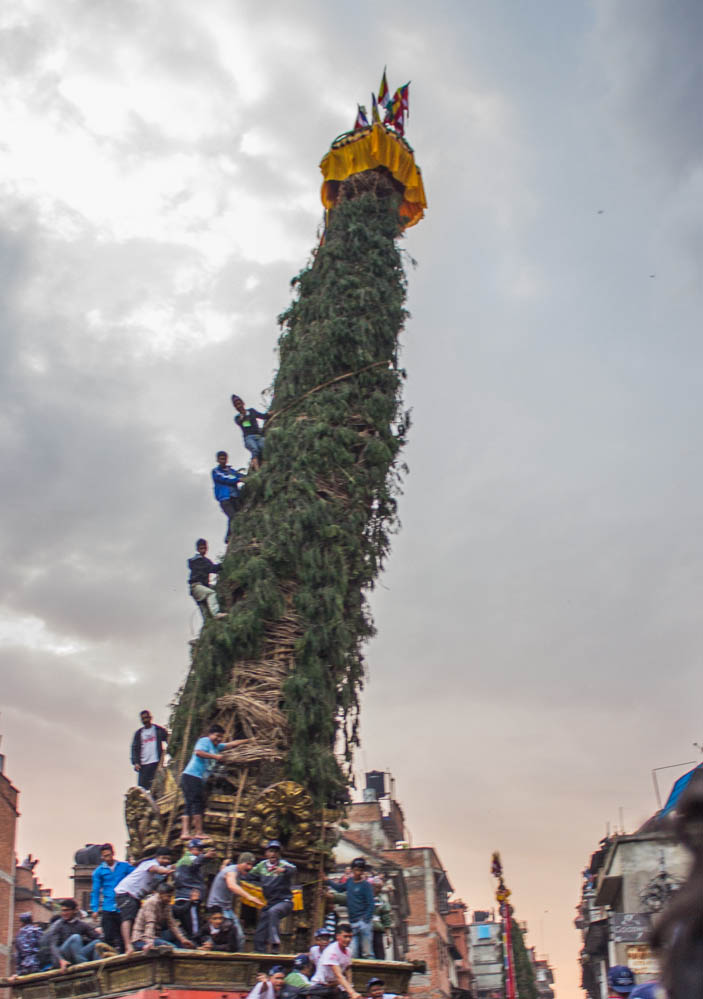
Rato Macchindranath Chariot at Patan, Nepal

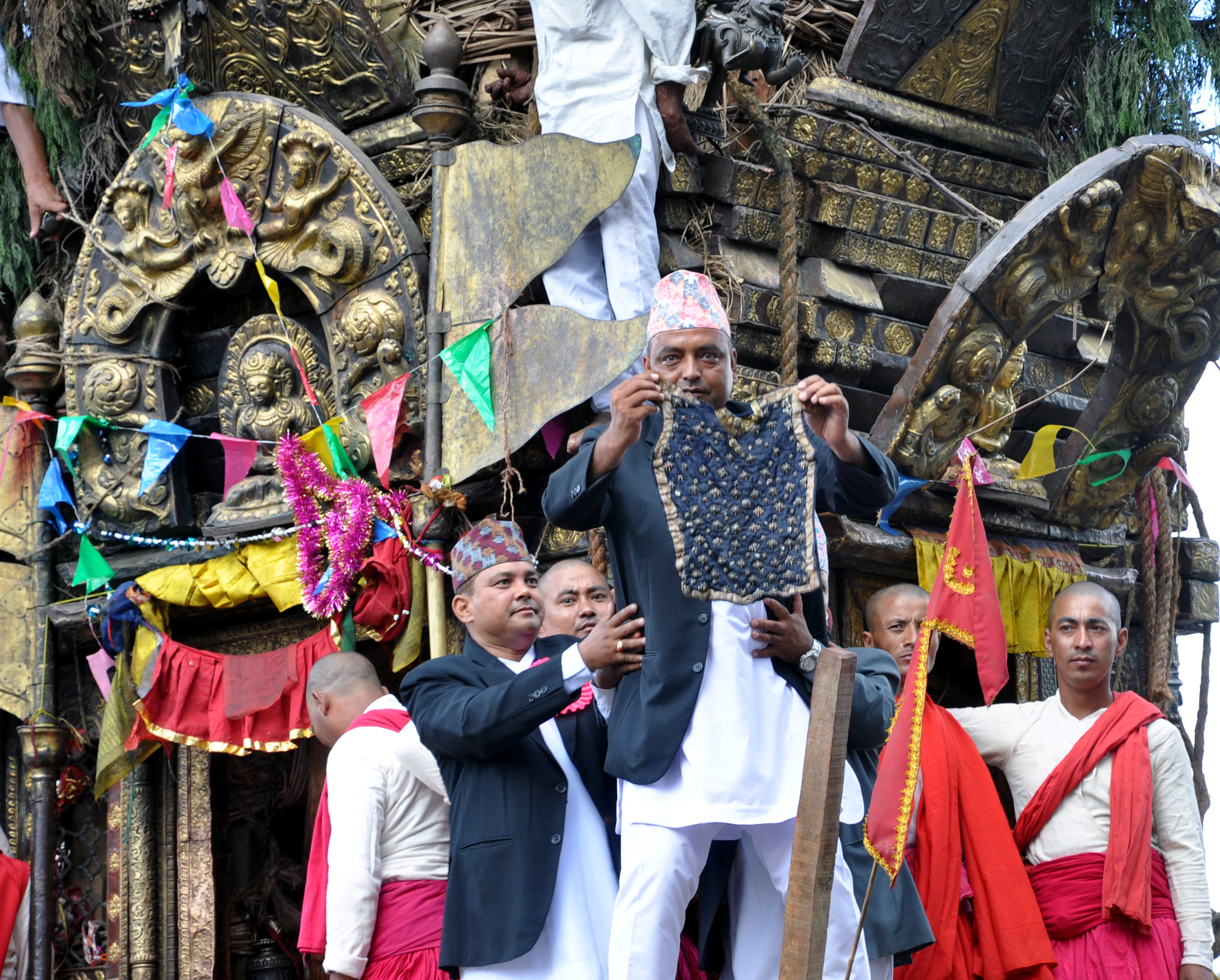
Showing the vest to the crowds

An important event connected with the deity is the annual chariot procession known as Bunga Dyah Jatra or Rato Macchindranath Jatra. Each year, the locals of Patan, Lalitpur celebrate the festival in order to show respect to the rain god. This festival is one of the oldest and the longest festival celebrated in Patan and is celebrated in April–May.

It is celebrated just before the monsoon season starts so that the city will get plenty rainfall for good growth of crops. During the procession, the image of Bunga Dyah is placed on a tall chariot about 65 feet high and pulled in stages through the streets of Patan for a month.

Before the chariot festival starts, the ritual of Mahasnana is conducted in an auspicious hour as indicated by the astrologers, about 15 days before the chariot festival. The deity is taken to a platform at Lagankhel which is about 200 meters away from the temple of Machindranath at Ta: bahal Lalitpur. There in front of a crowd, the god is given a bath with the sacred water mixture of honey, milk, and water fetched by the panejus (priests) in the four silver kalasa (vessel). The four priests then pour the sacred water (jal) from four directions in the platform to the deity and it is believed that from whichever direction 1st the jal touches the deity from the same direction monsoon will start or first rain will be granted.

After the mahasnana, the repairs are done to the idol of the deity if required and the new face is painted. After the face painting is over various ritual are performed to the deity-like Bareychukegu; Ihi; Bara tyegu as done to a human and at the end Dashakarma vidhi is performed. While these all are going to the temple premises, the chariot or ratha is made at Pulchowk by the Barahi and Yawal clans, amongst which one only does the rope work and other only the woodwork. In the construction of the chariot, no nails are used to connect the joints of the huge chariot but are only tied with ropes and veds. The only part that uses an iron to hold are the four wheels. After the construction is finished the deity is ascended in the divine vehicle i.e. 3 days before the pulling of the chariot.

The route of the chariot procession starts at Pulchwok and passes through Gabahal, Sundhara, Lagankhel and ends at Jawalakhel. Previously the festival was called the festival of three states viz. Kathmandu, Bhaktapur, Lalitpur as the deity was brought by the alliance of these three states. So, previously the 1st day of the festival was to be carried on by people of Kathmandu then by Bhaktapur and then 3rd by Lalitpur, and on last day all three sister cities come together for Jawalakhel Jatra with other nearby city people from Kirtipur and others from the valley.

After the chariot reaches Jawalakhel, the festival concludes with Bhoto Jatra, which literally means "vest festival". During the ceremony, a government official holds up a jewel-studded black vest from the four sides of the chariot so that all the people gathered around can have a look at it.

After the festival, the chariot is dismantled and Rato Macchindranath is taken to a temple in the nearby village of Bungamati, which is the first home of the rain god. Rato Macchindranath spends the next six months in that temple. Machhendranath is an important festival for the Newar people. They celebrate it because Macchendranath saved them from a drought once and gave the water by making Karkotak relieve the water serpents.

== Temples in India ==
- Shri Kshetra Machindranath Samadhi mandir maymba Sawargaon, pathardi, Dist Ahmadnagar
- Macchindranath temple in kille-Machhindragad Tal: Walwa (Islampur) Dist: Sangli, Maharashtra
- Vishwayogi Swami Machindranath Mandir, Mitmita: Aurangabad
- Macchindranath temple, UJJAIN, Madhya Pradesh
- Machhindra Nath Mandir, Inside Ambagate, Amravati
- Machindra Nath Tapobhumi, Devacho Dongar, Kudal, Maharashtra, Dist Sindhudurg.(This Holy place is mentioned in the 6th Chapter of Navnath Grantha)
- Macchendranath Guru Peeth in Sri Guru Parashakthi Kshethra: Madyar: Mangalore, Dakshina Kannada district.
- Machendranath Gudi in sri kadri manjunatheshwara temple, mangalore, dakshina kannada dist, karnataka

== In popular culture ==
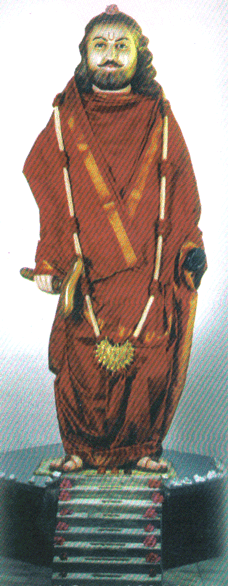
Matsyendranatha or Matsyendranātha

In the Dasam Granth, Guru Gobind Singh narrated a discourse between Matsyendranatha and Paras Nath on Intuitive (Bibek) and Non-Intuitive Mind (Abibek). Parasnatha subdued kings of the world and turned egoistic, and was broken by Matsyendranatha's spiritual preachings. This granth is regarded among Spiritual warriors of Khalsa Panths called Nihang Singhs.

Films about this legend in Indian cinema include:

- Guru Machhindranath is a 1923 Indian silent film by Shree Nath Patankar.
- The first film entitled Maya Machhindra was made in 1932 in Hindi and Marathi languages by Prabhat Film Company and directed by V. Shantaram. Govindrao Tembe portrayed the role of Machhindranath.
- The second film (of the same title) was made in 1939 in the Tamil language directed by Raja Chandrasekhar and starring N. S. Krishnan and M. G. Ramachandran.
- The third film in the Telugu language, also titled Maya Machhindra, was made P. Pullaiah in 1945 starring Jandhyala Gourinatha Sastry, Addanki Srirama Murthy and P. Kannamba.
- The fourth film was again made in Hindi and Marathi languages in 1951 directed by Aspi Irani.
- The fifth film was made in Hindi language by Babubhai Mistry in 1960/61.
- The sixth film, Maya Maschindra, was made in Telugu language in 1975 starring N. T. Rama Rao and directed by Kamalakara Kameswara Rao.

== See also ==
- Gorakhnath Math
