= Bungamati =

Bungamati बुङ्गमती Bunga:, Amarapur (Old)
- Lalitpur Metropolitan City
- Location in Nepal
- Coordinates: 27.62°N 85.30°E
- Country: Nepal
- Province: Bagmati Province
- District: Lalitpur District

Population (2011)
  - Total: 5,720
- Time zone: UTC+5:45 (Nepal Time)

Bungamati (Newar: बुंगमती), is a settlement in Lalitpur Metropolitan Region, Ward No. 22 in Lalitpur District, Nepal. Bungamati is a Newar town on a spur of land overlooking the Bagmati River

The first stele of the Licchavi king Amshuverma was found in Bungamati and dated to 605. It contains the earliest mention of the Kailashkut Bhawan palace.

== Names and history ==
During the Licchavi Kingdom, the town was called Bugayumigrama. The word 'Bugayumi' is a Kiratian dialect so it is proof that the settlement had come into existence since the Kirati period before the Christian Era. During the Malla period, it was called Bungapattan. Bungamati is also called Amarapur or Amaravatipur.

The original settlement of Bungamati was located uphill around the recent 'Chunikhel' area; recent 'Bungamati' being the place of cremation surrounded by huge forest, the original place is still called 'Bugal'. It is said that when Red Machhindranath was brought into the valley, then the settlement was shifted to the present location of Bungamati after the temple of Red Machhindranath was constructed.

== Temples and monasteries ==
Bungamati is the hometown of the deity Machhindranath, regarded as the patron of the valley and his large shikhara-style temple in the center of the village square is his home for six months of the year; he spends the rest of his time in Patan. The process of moving him back and forth between Patan and Bungamati is one of the most important annual festivals in the valley.

The Karya Binayak Temple, one of the most important temples in Nepal, is dedicated to Ganesha. The view is spectacular from the temple, which is surrounded by trees and large bamboo and overlooks the Bagmati valley to the foothills.

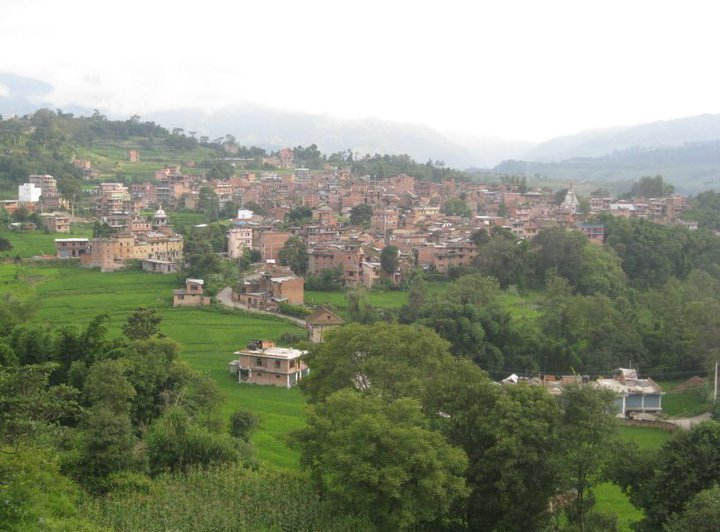

=== Machhindranath Temple ===
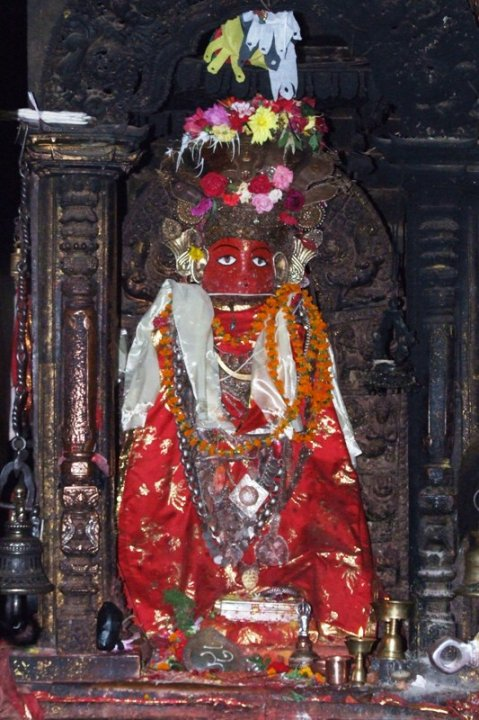

The central ritual focus of Bungamati is the Temple of Machhindranath. To the villagers, Machhindranath is known by the name “Bungadeya”; the name is derived either after the village esd founded at the spot where Bhairav howled “bu” (birthplace) or from the word “Bungaa:” meaning “watering place” or “spring” like the explanation of the name of the village and several residents in Bungamati offer the second derivation. Bungadeya has many important mythological, historical and contemporary ritual associations with water. Bungadeya was a primordial rain god who was later identified with the benevolent Aryavalokiteshvara. Machhindranath is also known by the name “Karunamaya” meaning an embodiment of love and kindness like a mother figure. While Bungamati Newa people refer to Machhindranath as Bungadeya, Newas from other parts of the valley use the name Karunamaya to refer to Machhindranath. The gods of Bungamati and Patan are also identified as Raktapadmapani Lokeshvara and Aryavalokiteshvara.

Another important part of historical importance in Bungamati is the living goddess, Kumari. Generally, people only know three Kumaris (in Kathmandu, Patan, and Bhaktapur), but there is also one in Bungamati.

=== Hayangriva Bhairab Temple ===
Hayagriva Bhairav is an important deity in the Kathmandu Valley of Nepal. He is considered the chief among the ancient Bhairavs of the valley. The people of Bungamati, a town in the valley, worship him as their protector and ancestor god.

History There are no written records showing when the Hayagriva Bhairav temple was first built. However, an ancient wooden carving called a Salivanjika tundal was present in the temple before it was removed. This carving showed pre-medieval art, suggesting that the temple has existed since ancient times.

Copperplate inscriptions and stone tablets from the Malla period have been found. These documents talk about repairs and restoration work done on the temple during that time.

The Kirati people, who were early settlers in the valley, had a tradition of worshipping ancestor gods. This supports the idea that Hayagriva Bhairav has very old roots in the area.

According to local accounts, when the deity Bungadya (also known as Machhendranath) was first brought to the Kathmandu Valley, several Bhairavs came to welcome him. These included Hayagriva Bhairav from Bungamati, Svet Bhairav from Lubhu, Krodh Bhairav from Harisiddhi, Sanhar Bhairav from Lele, and Chandra Bhairav from Patan-Ikhalakhu. This shows that Hayagriva Bhairav already existed at that time.

The name Hayagriva (sometimes written as Hangriva or Haygreve) means "horse-necked" in Sanskrit. A small horse head is shown on top of this Bhairav's head.

In Buddhism, the Bodhisattva (a compassionate being) is sometimes shown as a flying horse. This is seen in the story of Simhasarthabahu. Because of this connection, Hayagriva Bhairav can be seen as a devotee of the horse. In Tibetan Nyingmapa Buddhism and Vajrayana Buddhism, Hayagriva Bhairav is also shown as a Bodhisattva.

Hayagriva Bhairav has a red face with three eyes. His expression looks angry, but it is actually meant to be a laughing face. This is similar to the deity Bungadya, who also has a red face.

The temple has a quadrangular (four-sided) design. This is common for Bhairav temples in the Nepal Mandala region. The eastern side of the temple has a structure belonging to the Chaura Guthi, a local community group. In Eastern philosophy, the four-sided shape represents the universe.

The people of Bungamati see Hayagriva Bhairav as their father or king. There is a popular belief that kings from the Shah dynasty should not enter Bungamati. It is said that if they do, they will die.

According to local stories, a king named Mukundasen from the nearby kingdom of Palpa once attacked Bungamati. He took the idol of Hayagriva Bhairav and carried it away to Palpa. Later, he felt sorry for his actions. He apologized and brought the idol back to Bungamati. A tradition of performing a special worship to remember this forgiveness continues to this day.

Hayagriva Bhairav is worshipped first during all special festivals and rituals in Bungamati. When people in the town perform ceremonies like taking religious vows, they must come to this temple to complete the ritual.

The priests of this temple are called "Delaju Khala:". They have the traditional right to perform the worship here.

=== Manakamana Temple or Aju/Aji Bhairav Temple ===
Bungamati is also abode of Goddess Manakamana. People believe that Manakamana is in Gorkha district, but the fact is the original Manakamana is in Bungamati. It is said that upper part of the body of Goddess above navel is in Bungamati and lower part of the body below navel is in Gorkha.

Bungamati observes Manakamana Jatra as the main festival of Bungamati which usually occurs in the month of October during Navami, Dashami and Ekadashami of Dashain festival. During those three days the temple at Gorkha is shut down and the priest sends the devotees to Bungamati

=== Shristikanta Lokeshvara Temple ===
Bungamati is the birthplace of Shristikanta Lokeshvara, the god attributed to the creation (shristi) of overall living entities of the world.

There is ample of evidences that shows Bungamati as the foremost settlement of Kathmandu Valley, and one of the reason is it is the abode of Shristikanta Lokeshvara who created existence of Nepa Valley.

=== Karyabinayak Temple ===
Karyabinayak Temple was built on the fourth Thursday of the month of Chait in Nepal Samvat 781 (1661 AD) under the leadership of leader Purna Singh of Bungamati. At this time the reign of Shri Niwas Malla had just begun in Patan. Inside this temple, worship is done on a naturally formed stone in the shape of Ganesha. But now, a statue of Ganesha covered with artistic silver is also kept.

Karyabinayak is one of the four famous Vinayakas of Kathmandu Valley. Other Vinayakas are Jal Binayak of Chobhar, Surya Binayak of Bhaktapur and Ashok Binayak of Kathmandu.Before starting any work, devotees come to Karyabinayak to wish for the successful completion of that work. Devotees get crowded on Tuesdays and Saturdays.

Most of the priests have come to this temple with the surname 'Tuladhar'. The association of priests is also called 'Nine Priests Association'. On the day of Paha Chahre (during the Ghoda Jatra) there is a Karyabinayak deity procession in Bungamati.The people of Bungamati call this place Gale, which means forest. Therefore, Karyabinayak is also a famous picnic spot. The temple is built in a small size in the tiered style, which was renovated during the reign of King Mahendra.

== April 2015 Nepal earthquake ==
After the April 2015 Nepal earthquake, the city saw a massive destruction as most of its houses were made up of traditional mud and brick elements.

Almost three years after the earthquake residents in Bungamati have yet to see any restoration work. Both residential homes and historic monuments remain in ruins. Faced with a winter of little shelter residents moved back into damaged buildings.

== Gallery ==
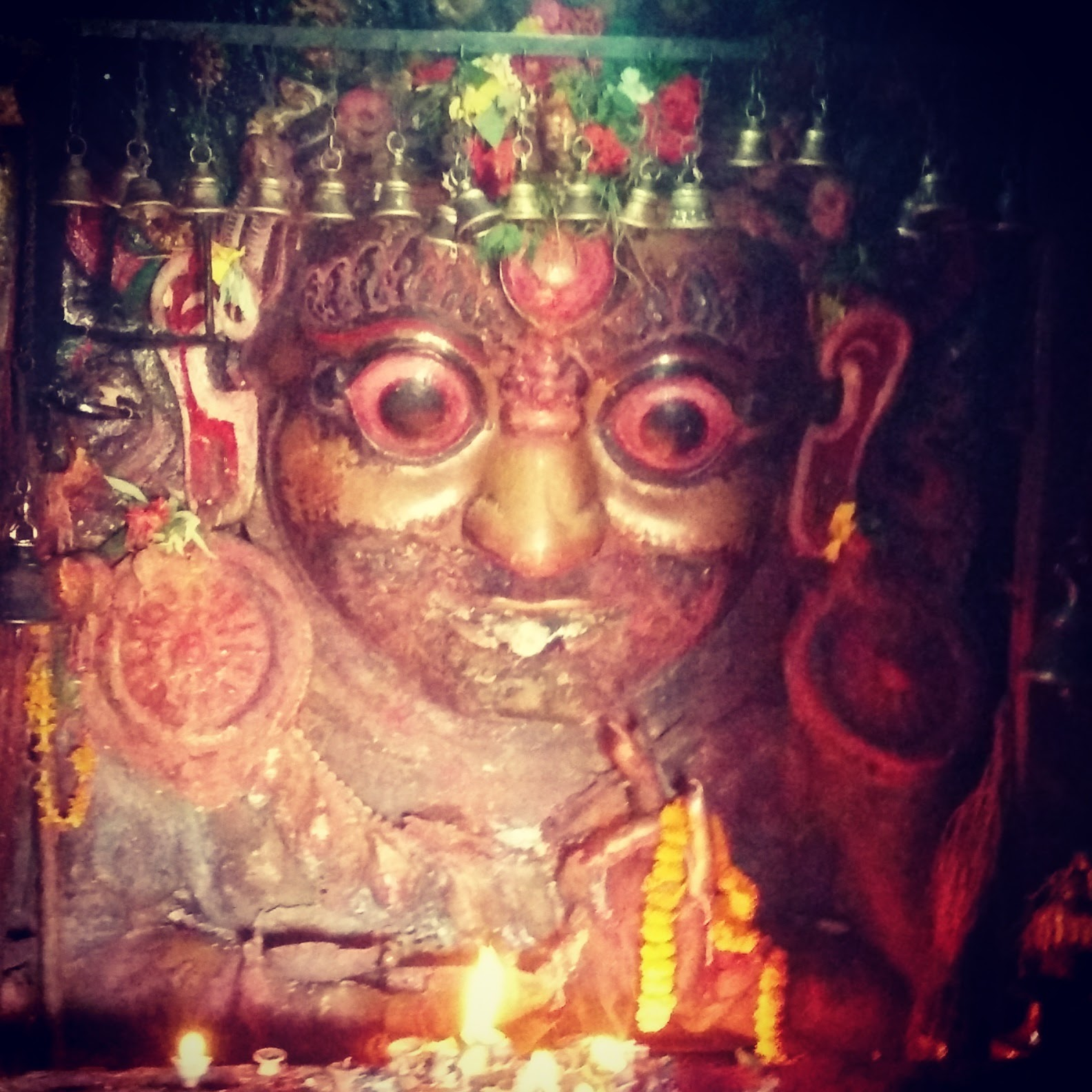
Bugmati Bhairav

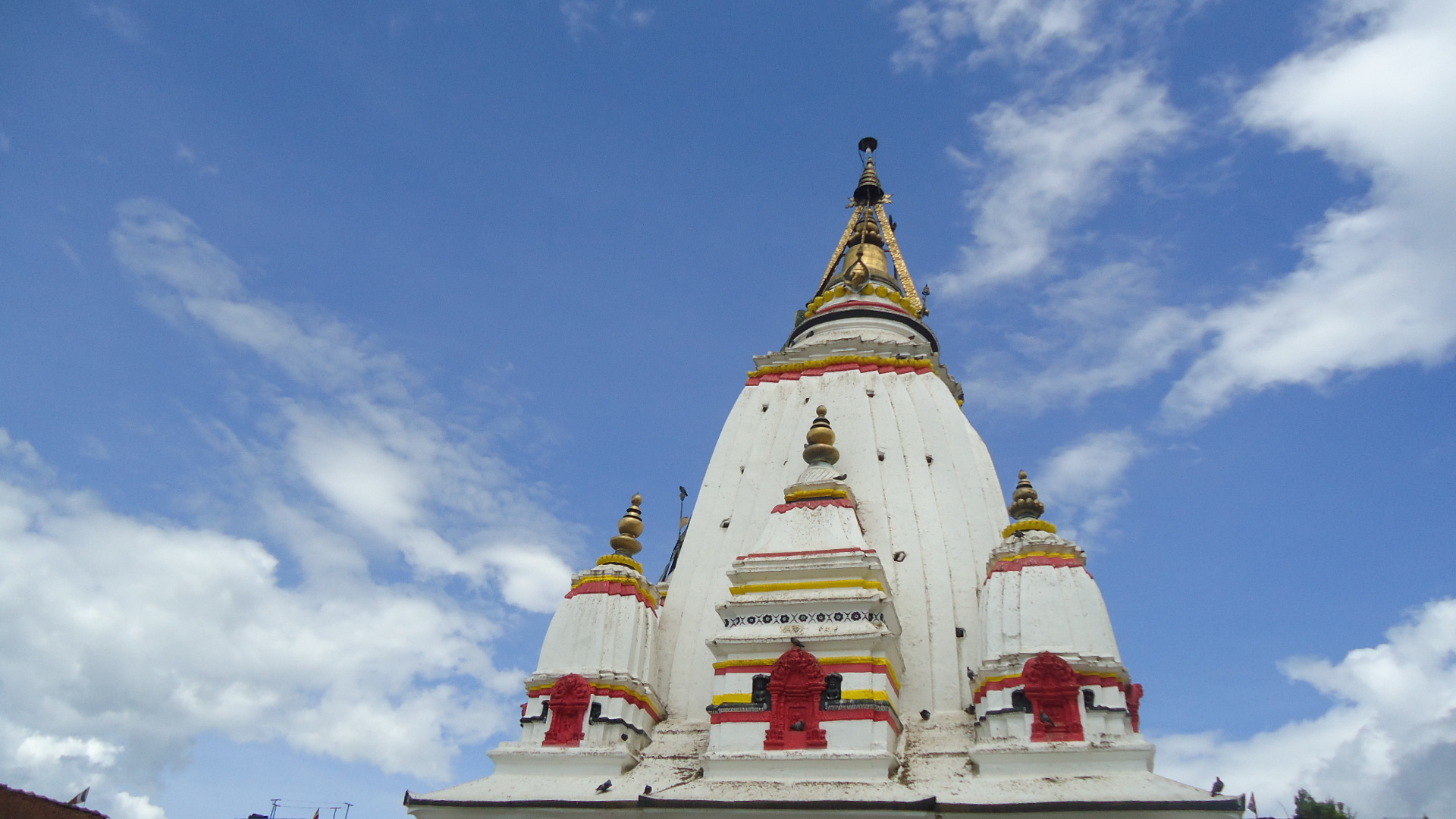

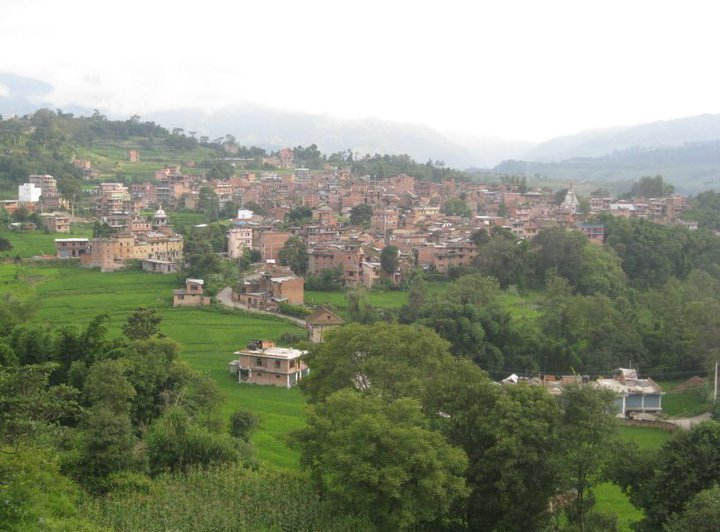

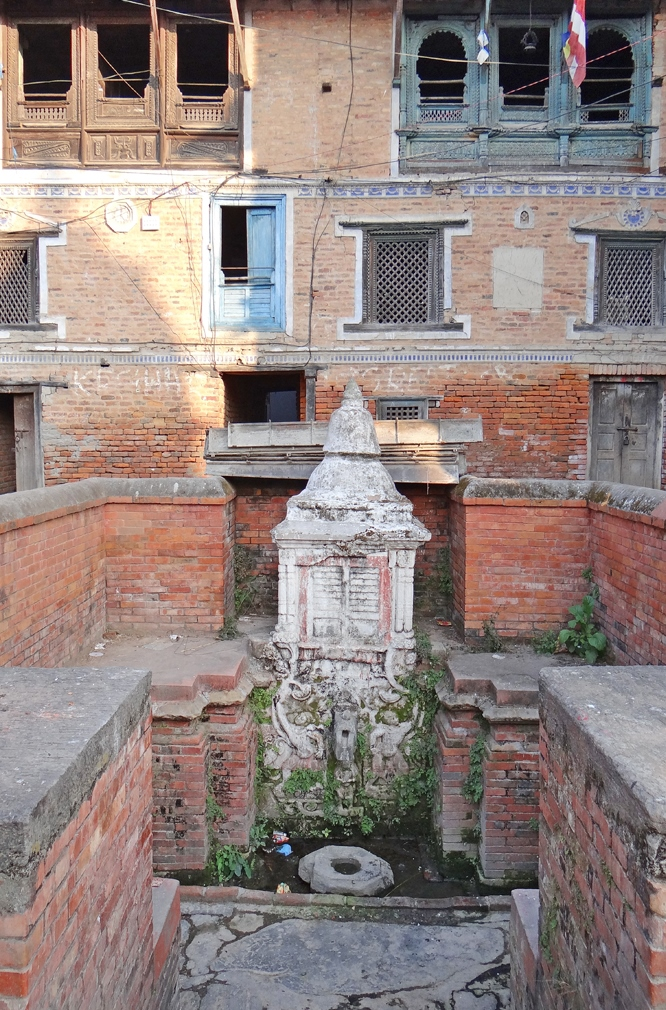

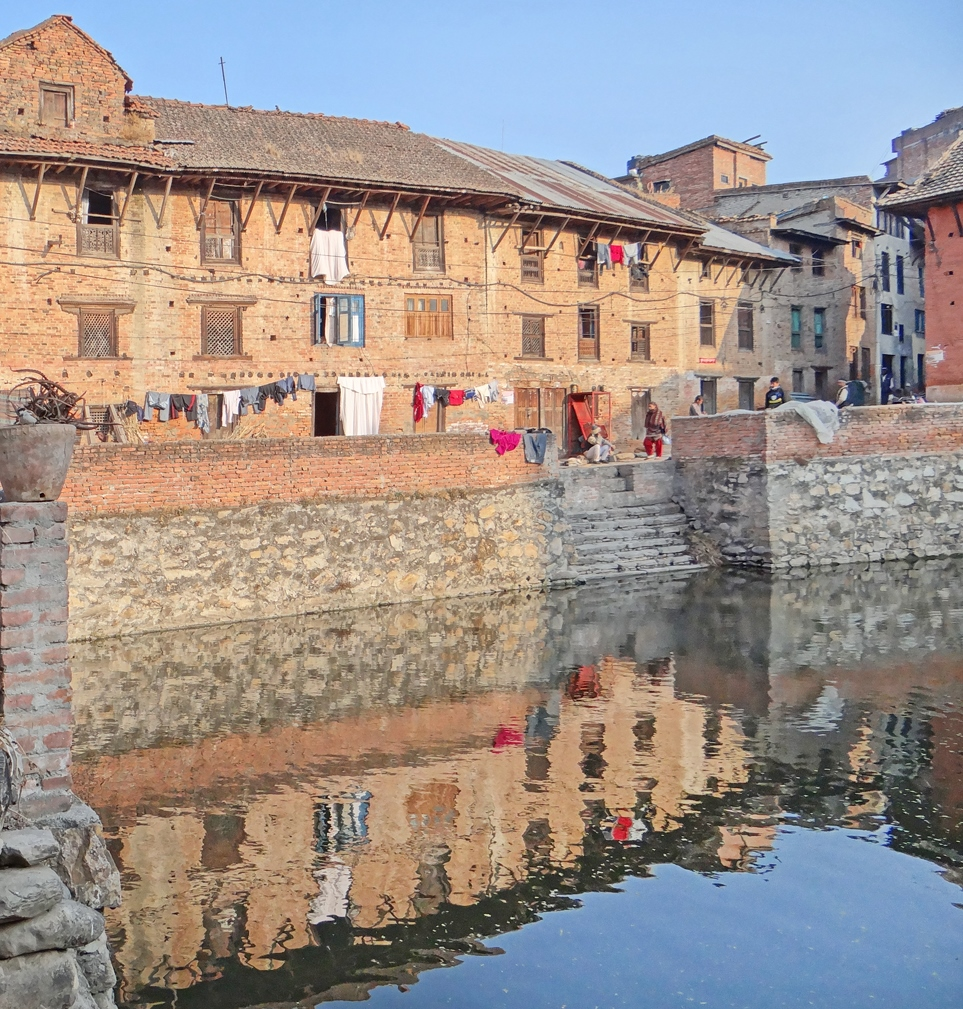

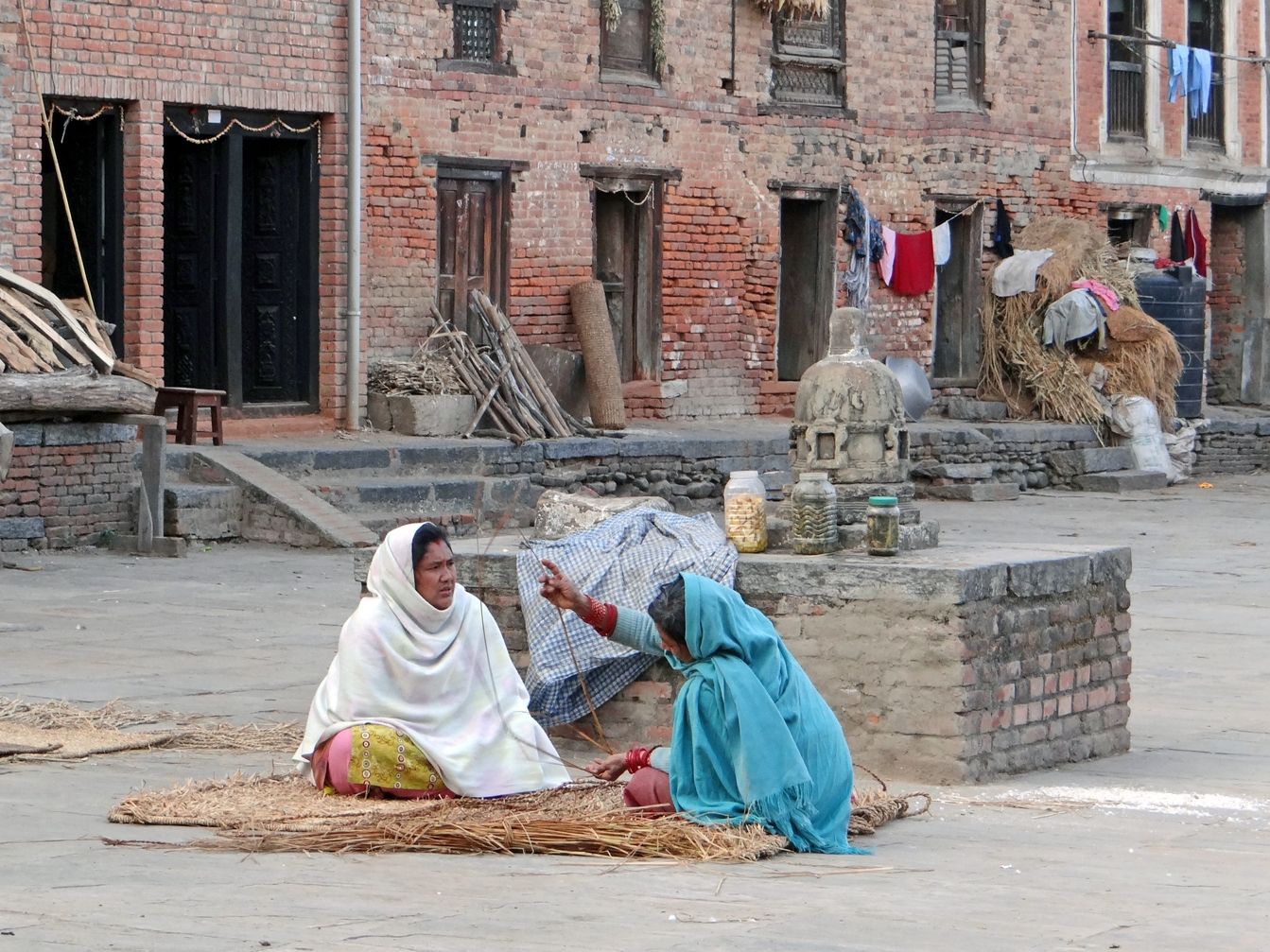

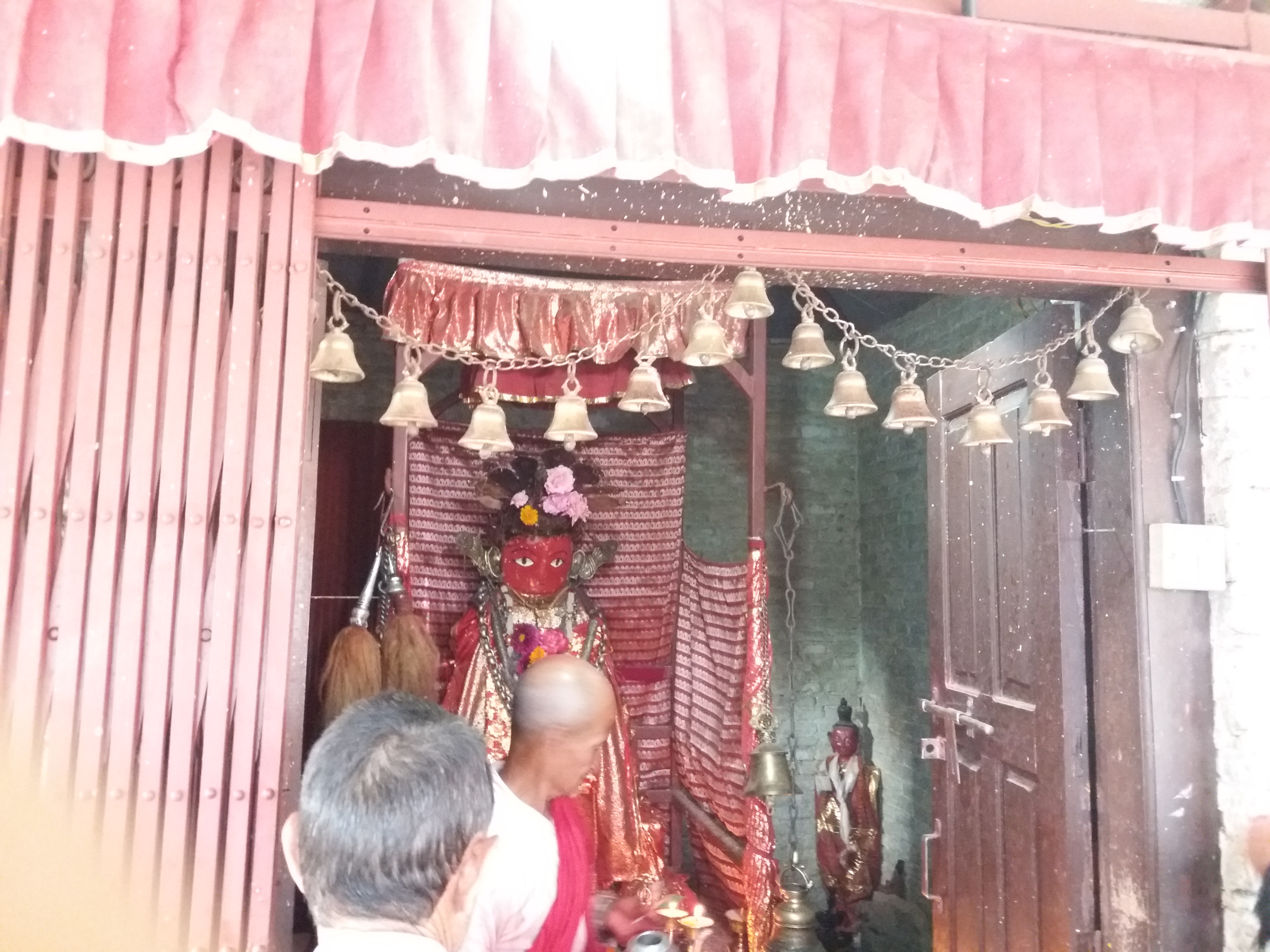
