= Navanatha Sampradaya =

Nine Hindu saints of the Navnath lineage

The Navanatha (Sanskrit: नवनाथ), also spelt as Navnath in vernacular languages, are the nine saints, Masters or Naths on whom the Navnath Sampradaya, the lineage of the nine gurus, is based. They are worshipped collectively as well as individually, and belongs to the Nath-tradition.

== Nine gurus ==
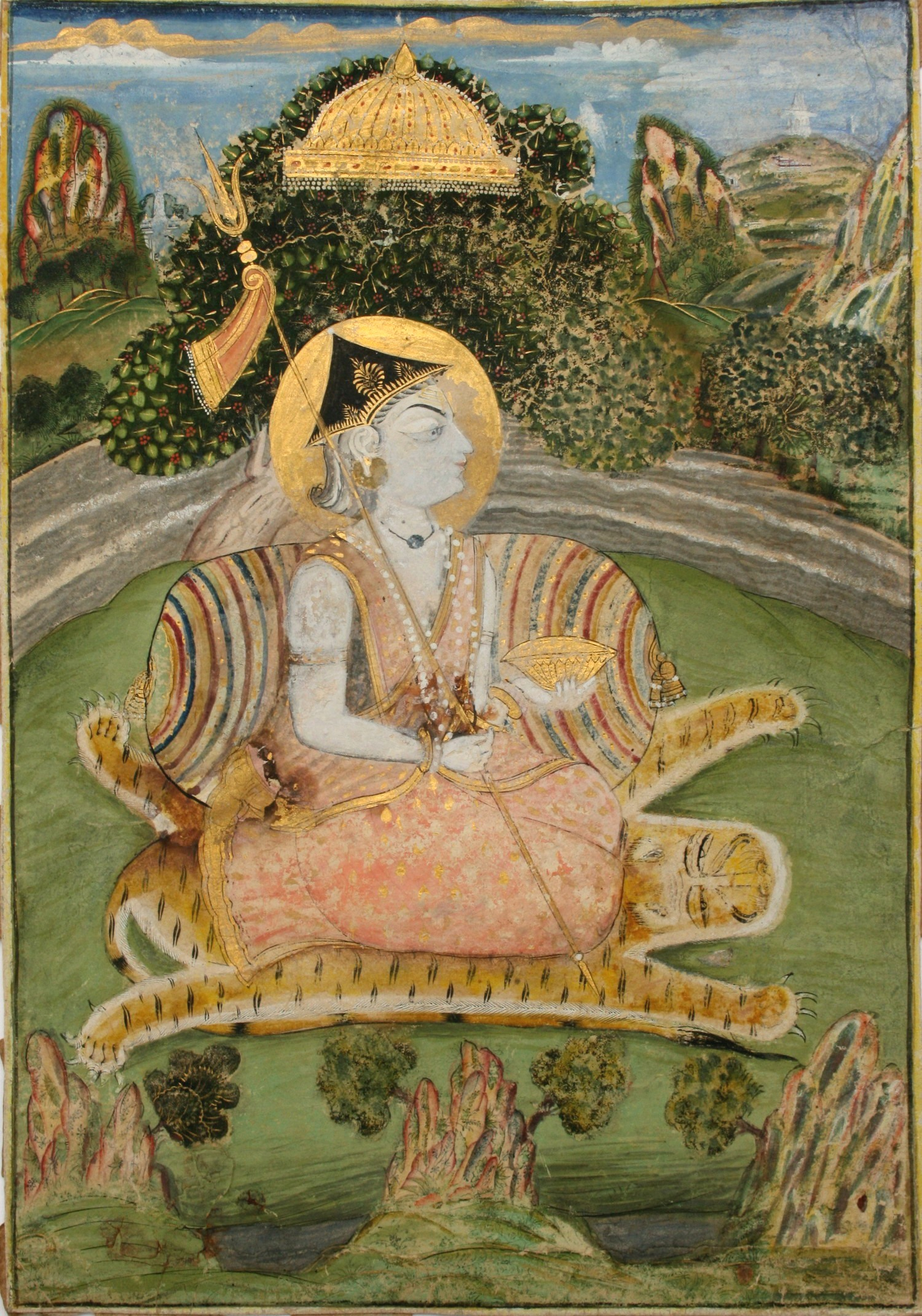
Jalandharnath

Nath Sampraday believes that Rishi Dattatreya, an incarnation of the Hindu trinity Brahma, Vishnu and Shiva, was its first teacher. Other traditions hold that Matsyendranath received initiation directly from Shiva, also known as Adi Nath. In many modern Nath groups, worship of Gorakshanath and Shiva is primary. The nine teachers, collectively known as Navnaths, are considered representative of great teachers in this tradition or parampara.

Several lists are known:

=== Nisargadatta Maharaj ===
According to both Maurice Frydman, translator of Nisargadatta Maharaj's I Am That, and Saumitra K. Mullarpattan, Maharaj's primary interpreter, "the most widely accepted list" is as follows:

1. Matsyendranatha or Machhindranath (9th century), "who was said to be initiated by Shiva (next to Vishnu and Brahma one of the three primary Hindu gods) in the science and teaching of Yoga."
2. Gorakshanath or Gorakhnath
3. Jalandharanatha or Jalandharnath
4. Kaniphanatha or Kanhoba
5. Gahininatha or Gehininath
6. Bhartrinatha or Bhartiharinath or Raja Bharthari or Bhartrihari
7. Revananatha or Revan Siddha or Kada Siddha or Ravalanath
8. Charpatakshanatha or Charpatinath
9. Naganatha or Nageshnath

=== List 2 ===
Matsyendranath (the chief Natha), Gorakshanatha, Charpatinatha, Mangalnatha, Ghugonatha, Gopinatha, Prannatha, Suratnatha and Cambanatha. They are not related to the divisions of the orders.

=== List 3 ===
In another list each Natha is identified with a Hindu god:1. Aumkar Adinatha (Lord of Lords), Siva; 2. Shelnatha (Lord of the Arrow Shaft), Krisna or Rama Chandra; 3. Santoknatha (Lord of Gratification) 4. Acalacambhunatha (Lord of Wondrous Immortality), Hanuman or Laksman; 5. Gajbali Gajkanthnatha (Lord of the Elephant's Strength and Neck)) Ganesa Gajikarna (Elephant-Eared); 6. Prajnatha, or Udaynatha (Lord of the People), Parvati; 7. Mayarupi Macchendranatha (The Wondrous Form), Guru of Gorakhnatha; 8. Gathepinde Ricayakari, or Naranthar, Sambhujaiti Guru Gorakhnatha; 9. Gyansarupe, or Purakh Siddh Cauranjwenatha, or Puran Bhagat.

=== List 4 ===
Orhkarinath, Visnu; Samtokanath, Visnu; Gajboli, Gajana, Hanuman; Acalesvar, Ganpati; Udayanatha, Surya; Parvati Prem, Mahadeo; Santhanatha, Brahma; Gyaniji Siddhacewarafigi, Jaggannath; Mayarupi, Matsya. The Nathas are also the guardian spirits of the Himalayan peaks.

=== List 5 ===
1.Adinath 2. Udaynath Parvati 3.Satyanath Brahamaji 4.Santoshnath Vishnuji 5.Achabhenath Shesh 6.Kanthadnath Ganeshji 7.Chaurangi Chandrma 8.Matsyendranath 9.Gorakhnathh.

=== List 6 ===
Omkarnath, Udaynath, Santoshnath, Achalnath, Gajbalinath, Gyannath, Chauranginath, Matsyendranath, Gorakhnath.

=== List 7 ===
Macchendranatha, Gorakhnath, Jalandhernath, Kanifnath, Charpatinath, Naagnath, Bhartrharinath, Gahininath, Ravennath.

=== List 8 ===
Shri Gorakhnath, Javaalendranath, Kaarinanath, Gahini nath, Charpath nath, Revan nath, Naag nath, Bharthari Nath, Gopichand Nath.
