= Kaadsiddheshwar =

Indian philosopher and guru (1905–2001)

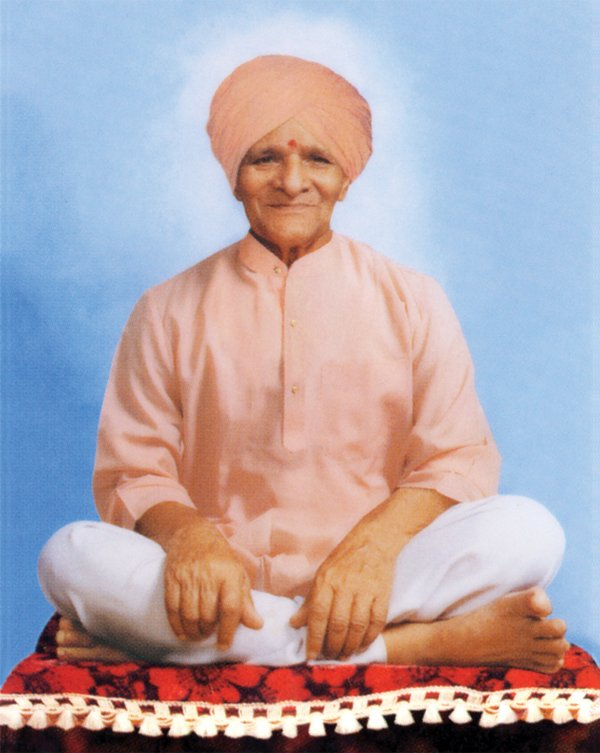
- Shri Smarth Sadguru Muppin Kadsiddheshwar Maharaj
- Born: 23 April 1905; Lingnoor (k nool), kolhapur, Maharashtra, India
- Died: 16 August 2001 (aged 96); Mumbai, Maharashtra, India
- Occupations: Philosopher, Guru

Shri Samarth Muppin Kaadsiddheshwar Maharaj (23 April 1905 – 16 August 2001) was a guru in the Navnath tradition of Hindu philosophy. He was a disciple of Shri Samarth Siddharameshwar Maharaj, disciple of Shri Samarth Bhausaheb Maharaj, disciple of Shri Gurulingajangam Maharaj (Shri Nimbargi Maharaj), disciple of the 22nd Shri Samarth Muppin Kaadsiddheswar Maharaj.

== Biography ==
Kaadsiddheswar was born on April 23, 1905 (Chaitra Sankashti day) in Linganoor village, Kolhapur district, Maharashtra state, India. His father's name was Shaigauda Patil, and he was named Jaigauda Patil. His living descendant is Indumati Magdum (daughter of his real sister). Indumati is 85 and lives with her son Sanjeev, daughter in law Jayashree and grand daughter Krupa in Nagala Park, Kolhapur.

He was formally adopted by the 25th Virupaksha Kaadeshwar of the Kaneri Math, Natha Parampara, and invested as the 26th Mathadheepati of the (Siddhagiri) Kaneri Math, Lingayat Parampara, in 1922 at the age of 17.

He was a master in yoga and mastered all the difficult asanas, such as the Kumbhak, which he could maintain for nine minutes. He would meditate for over ten hours a day, and from 1922 to 1935 he mastered all aspects of the Hindu spiritual tradition and philosophy.

He met his philosophical and spiritual guru, Siddharameshwar, in 1935. He was given a new outlook on the deep philosophical concepts and attained self-realization, or Gyan Drishti. He taught that concepts of sects and religions are an illusion and that everything is unified. To realize this unity is the simplest form of Vidnyani Avastha.

== The Kaadsiddheshwar Parampara ==
Shri Samarth Revannath (c. 1112 CE), one of the Navnath Parampara (The Nine Teachers) in the Indian Teacher-Disciple tradition, is considered the founder and the first Kaadsiddheshwar. He established the Kaadsiddheshwar temple and math at Kanheri village in Karveer tehsil, Kolhapur district, Maharashtra state, India. The Kaadsiddheshwar Peeth is also the main Kuldaivat (Dynastic Gods/Teachers) of the Lingayat Shaiva community. Shri Muppin Kaadsiddheswar Maharaj the 26th Mathaadheepati of this tradition from 1922 to 2001.

=== Siddhagiri Math (Kaneri Math) ===
The Siddhagiri Math was established around the Moola-Kaadsiddheswar Shiva temple in the Shaiva-Lingayat tradition. It is a vast campus with the central Shiva temple, Adhyatmik Center, and a complex of halls for discussions, residential hostels for devotees, and adjacent farms. About 1200 villages in the area are devoted to the Kaadsiddheswar Parampara.

=== Inchegiri Sampradaya ===
Kaadsiddheshwar's guru Siddharameshwar belonged to the Inchegiri Sampradaya, a Navnath/Lingayat sampradaya which is strongly influenced by the Sant Mat and the Deshastha Brahmin caste, to which the thirteenth century Varkari saint and philosopher Dnyaneshwar belonged, the 16th century sant Eknath, and the 17th century saint and spiritual poet Samarth Ramdas.

	Rishi Dattatreya (Note: Frydman 1987)								
Navnath, the nine founders of the Nath Sampradaya, (Note: Boucher) (Note: Frydman 1987)
	Gahininath, (Note: Dnyaneshwar) the 5th Navnath (Note: Frydman 1987)		Revananath, the 7th (Note: Frydman 1987) or 8th (Note: Boucher) Navnath, also known as Kada Siddha (Note: Kada Siddha (website Ranade Maharaj)					Siddhagiri Math (Note: Kada Siddha (website Ranade Maharaj)) (Note: Siddhagiri Math) c.q. Kaneri Math (est. 7th (Note: Siddhagiri Math (website Shri Kshetra Siddhagiri Math, Kaneri)) or 14th century (Note: Siddhagiri Math (Gramjivan Museum)); Lingayat Parampara (Note: Kaadsiddheshwar Maharaj (website Kaadsiddheshwar Maharaj)) c.q. Kaadasiddheshwar Parampara (Note: Kaadsiddheshwar Maharaj Parampara)	
	Nivruttinath, Dnyaneshwar's brother (Note: Dnyaneshwar)		Revananath, the 7th or 8th Navnath, also known as Kada Siddha					Siddhagiri Math c.q. Kaneri Math (est. 7th or 14th century; Lingayat Parampara c.q. Kaadasiddheshwar Parampara	
	Dnyaneshwar (Note: Nisargadatta Maharaj Disciples) (1275–1296) also known as Sant Jñāneshwar or Jñanadeva (Note: Nisargadatta Maharaj Disciples) and as Kadasiddha (Note: Frydman 1987) or Kad-Siddheshwar Maharaj (Note: Boucher)							Siddhagiri Math c.q. Kaneri Math (est. 7th or 14th century; Lingayat Parampara c.q. Kaadasiddheshwar Parampara	
Different accounts: Kadasiddha, (Note: Frydman 1987) also called "Almighty "Kadsiddeshwar", (Note: Ranjit Maharaj Timeline) who appeared as a vision to Sri Gurulingajangam Maharaj (Note: Ranjit Maharaj Timeline) or The 22nd or 24th (Note: Siddhagiri Math (website siddhagirimath.org)) Shri Samarth Muppin Kaadsiddheswar Maharaj, who initiated Sri Gurulingajangam Maharaj (Note: Siddhagiri Math (website siddhagirimath.org)) or "The 25th generation of the kadsiddha at siddhagiri had then initiated Guruling jangam maharaj of nimbargi." (Note: Kada Siddha (website Balkrushna Maharaj)) or "Juangam Maharaj" c.q. "a yogi [at Siddhagiri] who gave [Nimabargi Maharaj] a mantra and told him to meditate regularly on it" (Note: Boucher)
1	Nimbargi Maharaj (1789–1875) also known as Guru Lingam-Jangam Maharaj (Note: Boucher) (Note: Nimbargi Maharj (website Ranade Maharaj) (Note: Frydman 1987)							23rd Shri Samarth Muppin Kaadsiddheswar Maharaj	
2	Shri Bhausaheb Maharaj Umdikar (Note: Boucher) (Note: Bhausaheb Maharaj (website Ganapatrao Maharj)) (1843 Umdi – 1914 Inchgiri (Note: Bhausaheb Maharaj (website Ranade Maharaj)))							24th Shri Samarth Muppin Kaadsiddheswar Maharaj	
3	Shri Amburao Maharaj of Jigjivani (1857 Jigajevani – 1933 Inchgiri) (Note: Amburao Maharaj (website Ranade Maharaj)) (Note: Frydman 1987)	Shivalingavva Akka (1867–1930) (Note: Shivalingavva Akka (website Ranade Maharaj))	Girimalleshwar Maharaj (Note: Frydman 1987) (Note: Girimalleshwar Maharaj (website Balkrushnamauli Maharaj))			Sri Siddharameshwar Maharaj (1875–1936) (Note: Boucher) (Note: Frydman 1987)		25th Shri Samarth Muppin Kaadsiddheswar Maharaj	
4	Shri Gurudev Ranade of Nimbal (1886–1957) (Note: Amburao Maharaj Maharj (website Ranade Maharaj)) (Note: Ranade Maharaj (website Ranade Maharaj)) (Note: Boucher) (Note: Frydman 1987) (Note: Ranade Maharj (website Bridge-India))		Balkrishna Maharaj (Note: Balkrishna Maharaj (website Balkrishna Maharaj))	Shri Aujekar Laxman Maharaj (Note: Nagnath Alli Maharaj (website))	Madhavananda Prabhuji (d. 25th May, 1980) (Note: Madhavananda Prabhuji (website gurusfeet.com))	Sri Nisargadatta Maharaj (1897–1981) (Note: Boucher)	Sri Ranjit Maharaj (1913–2000) (Note: Boucher) (Note: Ranjit Maharaj (website Ranjit Maharaj)) (Note: Ranjit Maharaj Interview) (Note: Ranjit Maharaj Satsang); Sri Ganapatrao Maharaj Kannur (1909–2004) (Note: Bhausaheb Maharaj (website Ganapatrao Maharaj)); Shri Vilasanand Maharaj (1909–1993); Shri Ranachhodray Maharaj, Baitkhol Karwar	26th Shri Muppin Kaadsiddheshwar Maharaj (1905–2001) Student of Sri Siddharameshwar Maharaj (Note: Kaadsiddheshwar Maharaj (website Kaadsiddheshwar Maharaj))	
5	Shri Gurudev Chandra Bhanu Pathak (Note: Ranjit Maharaj (website Angelfire))		Bhausaheb Maharaj (Nandeshwar) (Note: Bhausaheb Maharaj (Nandeshwar) (website Balkrishna Maharaj))	Shri Nagnath Alli Maharaj (Note: Nagnath Alli Maharaj (website Nagnath Alli Maharaj))		Maurice Frydman (Note: Nisargadatta Maharaj Disciples); Ramesh Balsekar (Note: Nisargadatta Maharaj Disciples); Gautam Sachdeva (Note: Gautam Sachdeva); Ramakant Maharaj (Note: Ramakant Maharj (website Ramakant Maharaj)); Alexander Smit (Note: Nisargadatta Maharaj Disciples); Douwe Tiemersma (Note: Nisargadatta Maharaj Disciples); Robert Powell (Note: Nisargadatta Maharaj Disciples); Timothy Conway (Note: Nisargadatta Maharaj Disciples); Jean Dunn (Note: Nisargadatta Maharaj Disciples) (Note: Jean Dunn (website Ed Muzika)) (Note: Jean Dunn (website Ngeton)); Mark McCloskey (Note: Nisargadatta Maharaj Disciples); "Sailor" Bob Adamson (Note: Nisargadatta Maharaj Disciples) (Note: Sailor Bob Adamson (website Sailor Bob Adamson)); Stephen Wolinksky (Note: Nisargadatta Maharaj Disciples); Mark West (Note: Nisargadatta Maharaj Disciples); David Hargrove (Note: Nisargadatta Maharaj Disciples)		27th head: Adrushya Kadsiddheshwar Swamiji (Note: Siddhagiri Math – History (website siddhagirimath.org)	Jagadguru Ramanandacharya Shree Swami Narendracharyaji Maharaj (Note: Narendracharyaji Maharaj (website Narendracharyaji Maharaj))
Notes for table Notes Sources: Boucher, Cathy (2002), The Lineage of Nine Gurus. The Navnath Sampradaya and Sri Nisargadatta Maharaj; Frydman, Maurice (1987), Navanath Sampradaya. In: I Am That. Sri Nisargadatta Maharaj, Bombay: Chetana; Websites: Amburao Maharaj (website Ranade Maharaj): Gurudev R.D. Ranade, Sadguru Shri Amburao Maharaj Archived 2008-07-22 at the Wayback Machine; Balkrishna Maharaj (website Balkrishna Maharaj): balkrushnamauli.com, Samarth Sadguru Balkrushna Maharaj; Bhausaheb Maharaj (website Ranade Maharaj): Gurudev R.D. Ranade, Sadguru Shri Bhausaheb Maharaj Umdikar; Bhausaheb Maharaj (website Ganapatrao Maharaj): ShantiKuteer Ashram, Bhausaheb Maharaj; Bhausaheb Maharaj (Nandeshwar) (website Balkrishna Maharaj): balkrushnamauli.com, Shri Bhausaheb Maharaj (Nandeshwar); Dnyaneshwar: V. V. Shirvaikar, A brief biography of saint Dnyaneshwar (Jnanadeva); Gautam Sachdeva: gautamsachdeva.com, About Gautam Sachdeva; Girimalleshwar Maharaj (website Balkrushnamauli Maharaj): balkrushnamauli.com, Girimalleshwar Maharaj; Jean Dunn (website Ed Muzika): Jean Dunn and Nisargadatta Maharaj; Jean Dunn (website Ngeton): Ngeton, Navnath Masters; Kaadsiddheshwar Maharaj (website Kaadsiddheshwar Maharaj): Mazad Sad Guru, Biography; Kaadsiddheshwar Maharaj Parampara: mazasadguru.com, The Kaadsiddheshwar Parampara; Kada Siddha (website Ranade Maharaj): Gurudev R.D. Ranade, Kada Siddha; Kada Siddha (website Balkrushna Maharaj): Balkrushna Maharaj, Kadsiddheshwar Maharaj; Madhavananda Prabhuji (website gurusfeet.com)Gurus Feet, Madhavananda Prabhuji; Nagnath Alli Maharaj (website Nagnath Alli Maharaj): Shri S.S. Nagnath Alli Maharaj Sansthan, About us; Narendracharyaji Maharaj (website Narendracharyaji Maharaj): A brief biography of Jagadguru Ramanandacharya Sri Swami Narendracharyaji Maharaj; Nimbargi Maharaj (website Ranade Maharaj): Gurudev R.D. Ranade, Sadguru Shri Guruling Jangam Maharaj; Nisargadatta Maharaj Commemorations pt.1: David Godman, Remembering Nisargadatta Maharaj pt.1; Nisargadatta Maharaj Disciples: Advaita Vision, Navnath Sampradaya. Disciples of Nisargadatta Maharaj; Ramakant Maharaj (website Ramakant Maharaj): Shri Ramakant Maharaj, Information; Ranade Maharaj (website Ranade Maharaj): Gurudev R.D. Ranade, Shri Gurudev R. D. Ranade; Ranade Maharaj (website Bridge-India): Bridge-India, Shri Gurudev R.D. Ranade; Ranjit Maharaj (website Ranjit Maharaj): Sadguru.com, Shri Ranjit Maharaj; Ranjit Maharaj Timeline: Sadguru.com, Shri Ranjit Maharaj History; Ranjit Maharaj Interview: InnerQuest, Ranjit interview; Ranjit Maharaj Satsang: inner-quest.org, "Final Reality has no beginning and no end."; Ranjit Maharaj (website Angelfire): Sri Ranjit Maharaj profile; Sailor Bob Adamson (website Sailor Bob Adamson): Sailor Bob Adamson website; Shivalingavva Akka (website Ranade Maharaj): gurudevranade.com, Rv. Smt.Shri.Shivalingavva Akka; Siddhagiri Math: Detailed history of Shri Nisarghadatta Maharaj; Siddhagiri Math (website Shri Kshetra Siddhagiri Math, Kaneri): Shri Kshetra Siddhagiri Math, Kaneri; Siddhagiri Math (Gramjivan Museum): Siddhagiri Gramjivan Museum Kaneri Math; Siddhagiri Math (website siddhagirimath.org): siddhagirimath.org, Siddhagiri Math – Pedigree; Siddhagiri Math – History (website siddhagirimath.org): siddhagirimath.org, Siddhagiri Math – History

== His Contribution to the Hindu Spiritual Philosophy ==
Kaadsiddheswar worked extensively with poor laborers and farmers. He gave extensive discourses on Hindu philosophy and the right way to live, which would lead him to Gyan Drishti and Vignayni Avastha. His main focus was to live his life fully while understanding that the world is an illusion, or Maya. Realizing this is considered Gyan Drishti, literally knowledge and vision, and living according to this concept is to be in Vignayni Avastha.

He renovated the Kaneri Math and renamed it Siddhagiri Math. He constructed a 42 ft tall idol of a meditating Shiva with an equally massive Nandi, built halls and hostels for devotees, started a school with a hostel for poor, underprivileged students on the Math campus, and started an old-age home there.

He revitalized the pravachans (discourses) organized in the Siddhagiri Math. These were organized on every full moon and on every major Hindu religious occasion, like the Sharavan Month, the Navratri and Ramnavmi. However, the largest pravachans were organized on the three-day festival around Maha Shivarati day (February–March), where over 50,000 lakh devotees have been recorded at the Siddhagiri Math.

He also established maths in Mumbai, Mahabaleshwar, Khopi-Pedambe, Amurteshwar-Satara, Pune and elsewhere. Discourses were organized in these centers of philosophy regularly. They were delivered in the Marathi language and were very simple to understand. They mainly focused on the concept of "Aham Brahmasmi" ("I am Brahma"). Brahma is a complex word with several layers of meaning, including universe, soul, eternity, timelessness and nothingness. His constant teaching was "Ghabru Nakos" ("Do not fear" in Marathi) and "Soham" ("That Itself is Me"). He propagated the Shrimad Dasbodh, a book by Samarth Ramdas, as the basic and simplest book on philosophy. During His discourses, he would often quote the Mahāvākyas.

== Books ==
He wrote mainly in Marathi.

- Aachar va Parmartha (Behavior and The Right Way)
- Parmartha va Japanustha (The Right way and the Chanting of Mantras)
- Parmartha va Satkarma (The Right Way and Correct Actions)
- Parmartha va Swadharma (The Right Way and Self Philosophy)
- Dharma Parampara, Rudhi va Parmartha (The tradition of Right, Traditions and The Right Way)
- Maza Europe cha Daura – (My Travels to Europe)

He also wrote several essays on philosophy, mainly for the quarterly magazine Siddhagiri Sandesh (Message from Siddhagiri), published from 1964.

== Sources ==
- Bokil, Vinayak Pandurang (1979), Rajguru Ramdas, Kamalesh P. Bokil : sole distributors, International Book Service
- Boucher, Cathy (n.d.), The Lineage of Nine Gurus. The Navnath Sampradaya and Sri Nisargadatta Maharaj
