= Siddhagiri Gramjivan Museum (Kaneri Math) =

Sculpture museum in India

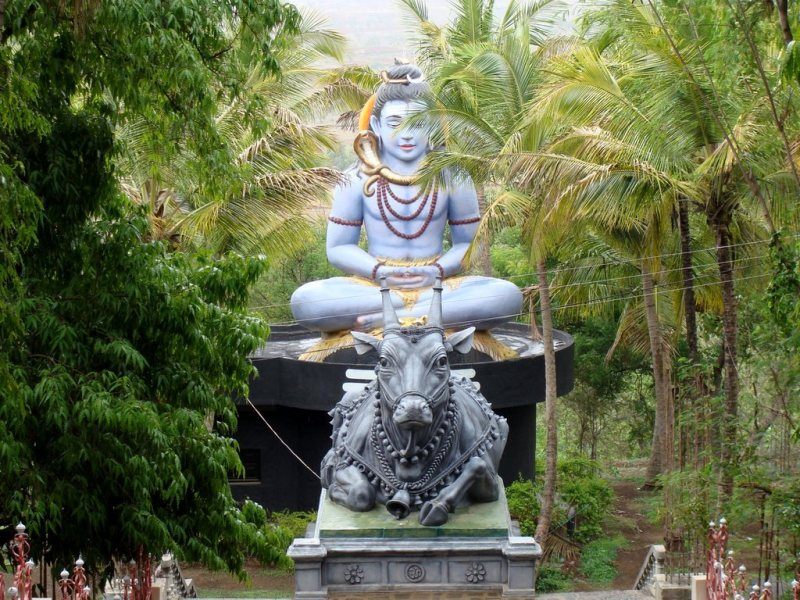
- Location: Kolhapur, Maharashtra, Kaneri, India

Siddhagiri Gramjivan Museum (Kaneri Math) at Kaneri, Kolhapur district, Maharashtra, is a sculpture museum. The full name is Siddhagiri Gramjivan (Village life) Museum. It is situated at Shri Kshetra Siddhagiri Math, a campus built around the Moola-Kaadsiddheswar Shiva temple.

== Museum description ==
This museum showcases different aspects of Gramjivan (village life). Gram means village and jeevan means life in the Marathi language. This initiative was the dream of Mahatma Gandhi, and was created through the vision and efforts of Siddhagiri Gurukul Foundation co. The history of self-sufficient village life in Maharashtra, before the invasion of the Mughals, is depicted in the form of cement sculptures. Each sculpture is lifelike and represents activities performed in daily village life. There were 12 Balutedars (essentially artisan castes), and 18 Alutedars who provided equipment to carry out domestic and professional tasks.

The museum is spread over 7 acres (28,000 m^{2}), and the surrounding countryside is beautiful, with lush greenery. Every aspect of village life has been depicted in almost 80 scenes that showcase more than 300 statues.

== Village scenes ==
The scenes of village life include:

- Village priest's abode. The first scene is the house of a highly educated village priest. He performs his duties, rites and rituals like weddings and thread ceremonies, and is tasked to find auspicious days and times for any major activity such as housebuilding and house-warming activities, digging wells, sowing seeds, piercing nose or ears. He earns his livelihood from Dakshina (donations) he receives. He consults the Panchaang (almanac) for finding auspicious dates.
- Goldsmith at work
- Ironsmith shoeing a bullock
- Barber shop
- Village well - villagers fetching water from the public well.
- Nursing an elder family member
- Grocer's shop - a woman visiting the grocery shop with her son. The shop-keeper is weighing items in an old weighing machine. Items like jaggery, sugar, chillies, salt, wheat, and rice are stocked. The son is asking his mother to buy kites for him.
- Farmer's wada (house)
- House of Vaidya
- Grandma stitching a godhadi (quilt)
- Farmers ploughing his farm using a bullock-drawn plow
- Shepherd boy with his herd of sheep
- Villagers performing Bhajan and Kirtan (singing Hindu devotional songs)

== Shiva temple ==
The museum has an old Shiva temple on the grounds. It is related to the Inchegeri Sampradaya, to which Nisargadatta Maharaj belongs. It is believed that a Shivling was installed by a Lingayat Priest on a beautiful hill in the 14th century. About 500 years ago, a Lingayat Priest, Shree Kadsiddheshwar Maharaj, developed and renovated it, and hence the place is now known by his name. The temple includes a 125 feet (38 m)-deep well, a 42 feet (13 m) Shiva idol, and a large Nandi bull.

	Rishi Dattatreya (Note: Frydman 1987)								
Navnath, the nine founders of the Nath Sampradaya, (Note: Boucher) (Note: Frydman 1987)
	Gahininath, (Note: Dnyaneshwar) the 5th Navnath (Note: Frydman 1987)		Revananath, the 7th (Note: Frydman 1987) or 8th (Note: Boucher) Navnath, also known as Kada Siddha (Note: Kada Siddha (website Ranade Maharaj)					Siddhagiri Math (Note: Kada Siddha (website Ranade Maharaj)) (Note: Siddhagiri Math) c.q. Kaneri Math (est. 7th (Note: Siddhagiri Math (website Shri Kshetra Siddhagiri Math, Kaneri)) or 14th century (Note: Siddhagiri Math (Gramjivan Museum)); Lingayat Parampara (Note: Kaadsiddheshwar Maharaj (website Kaadsiddheshwar Maharaj)) c.q. Kaadasiddheshwar Parampara (Note: Kaadsiddheshwar Maharaj Parampara)	
	Nivruttinath, Dnyaneshwar's brother (Note: Dnyaneshwar)		Revananath, the 7th or 8th Navnath, also known as Kada Siddha					Siddhagiri Math c.q. Kaneri Math (est. 7th or 14th century; Lingayat Parampara c.q. Kaadasiddheshwar Parampara	
	Dnyaneshwar (Note: Nisargadatta Maharaj Disciples) (1275–1296) also known as Sant Jñāneshwar or Jñanadeva (Note: Nisargadatta Maharaj Disciples) and as Kadasiddha (Note: Frydman 1987) or Kad-Siddheshwar Maharaj (Note: Boucher)							Siddhagiri Math c.q. Kaneri Math (est. 7th or 14th century; Lingayat Parampara c.q. Kaadasiddheshwar Parampara	
Different accounts: Kadasiddha, (Note: Frydman 1987) also called "Almighty "Kadsiddeshwar", (Note: Ranjit Maharaj Timeline) who appeared as a vision to Sri Gurulingajangam Maharaj (Note: Ranjit Maharaj Timeline) or The 22nd or 24th (Note: Siddhagiri Math (website siddhagirimath.org)) Shri Samarth Muppin Kaadsiddheswar Maharaj, who initiated Sri Gurulingajangam Maharaj (Note: Siddhagiri Math (website siddhagirimath.org)) or "The 25th generation of the kadsiddha at siddhagiri had then initiated Guruling jangam maharaj of nimbargi." (Note: Kada Siddha (website Balkrushna Maharaj)) or "Juangam Maharaj" c.q. "a yogi [at Siddhagiri] who gave [Nimabargi Maharaj] a mantra and told him to meditate regularly on it" (Note: Boucher)
1	Nimbargi Maharaj (1789–1875) also known as Guru Lingam-Jangam Maharaj (Note: Boucher) (Note: Nimbargi Maharj (website Ranade Maharaj) (Note: Frydman 1987)							23rd Shri Samarth Muppin Kaadsiddheswar Maharaj	
2	Shri Bhausaheb Maharaj Umdikar (Note: Boucher) (Note: Bhausaheb Maharaj (website Ganapatrao Maharj)) (1843 Umdi – 1914 Inchgiri (Note: Bhausaheb Maharaj (website Ranade Maharaj)))							24th Shri Samarth Muppin Kaadsiddheswar Maharaj	
3	Shri Amburao Maharaj of Jigjivani (1857 Jigajevani – 1933 Inchgiri) (Note: Amburao Maharaj (website Ranade Maharaj)) (Note: Frydman 1987)	Shivalingavva Akka (1867–1930) (Note: Shivalingavva Akka (website Ranade Maharaj))	Girimalleshwar Maharaj (Note: Frydman 1987) (Note: Girimalleshwar Maharaj (website Balkrushnamauli Maharaj))			Sri Siddharameshwar Maharaj (1875–1936) (Note: Boucher) (Note: Frydman 1987)		25th Shri Samarth Muppin Kaadsiddheswar Maharaj	
4	Shri Gurudev Ranade of Nimbal (1886–1957) (Note: Amburao Maharaj Maharj (website Ranade Maharaj)) (Note: Ranade Maharaj (website Ranade Maharaj)) (Note: Boucher) (Note: Frydman 1987) (Note: Ranade Maharj (website Bridge-India))		Balkrishna Maharaj (Note: Balkrishna Maharaj (website Balkrishna Maharaj))	Shri Aujekar Laxman Maharaj (Note: Nagnath Alli Maharaj (website))	Madhavananda Prabhuji (d. 25th May, 1980) (Note: Madhavananda Prabhuji (website gurusfeet.com))	Sri Nisargadatta Maharaj (1897–1981) (Note: Boucher)	Sri Ranjit Maharaj (1913–2000) (Note: Boucher) (Note: Ranjit Maharaj (website Ranjit Maharaj)) (Note: Ranjit Maharaj Interview) (Note: Ranjit Maharaj Satsang); Sri Ganapatrao Maharaj Kannur (1909–2004) (Note: Bhausaheb Maharaj (website Ganapatrao Maharaj)); Shri Vilasanand Maharaj (1909–1993); Shri Ranachhodray Maharaj, Baitkhol Karwar	26th Shri Muppin Kaadsiddheshwar Maharaj (1905–2001) Student of Sri Siddharameshwar Maharaj (Note: Kaadsiddheshwar Maharaj (website Kaadsiddheshwar Maharaj))	
5	Shri Gurudev Chandra Bhanu Pathak (Note: Ranjit Maharaj (website Angelfire))		Bhausaheb Maharaj (Nandeshwar) (Note: Bhausaheb Maharaj (Nandeshwar) (website Balkrishna Maharaj))	Shri Nagnath Alli Maharaj (Note: Nagnath Alli Maharaj (website Nagnath Alli Maharaj))		Maurice Frydman (Note: Nisargadatta Maharaj Disciples); Ramesh Balsekar (Note: Nisargadatta Maharaj Disciples); Gautam Sachdeva (Note: Gautam Sachdeva); Ramakant Maharaj (Note: Ramakant Maharj (website Ramakant Maharaj)); Alexander Smit (Note: Nisargadatta Maharaj Disciples); Douwe Tiemersma (Note: Nisargadatta Maharaj Disciples); Robert Powell (Note: Nisargadatta Maharaj Disciples); Timothy Conway (Note: Nisargadatta Maharaj Disciples); Jean Dunn (Note: Nisargadatta Maharaj Disciples) (Note: Jean Dunn (website Ed Muzika)) (Note: Jean Dunn (website Ngeton)); Mark McCloskey (Note: Nisargadatta Maharaj Disciples); "Sailor" Bob Adamson (Note: Nisargadatta Maharaj Disciples) (Note: Sailor Bob Adamson (website Sailor Bob Adamson)); Stephen Wolinksky (Note: Nisargadatta Maharaj Disciples); Mark West (Note: Nisargadatta Maharaj Disciples); David Hargrove (Note: Nisargadatta Maharaj Disciples)		27th head: Adrushya Kadsiddheshwar Swamiji (Note: Siddhagiri Math – History (website siddhagirimath.org)	Jagadguru Ramanandacharya Shree Swami Narendracharyaji Maharaj (Note: Narendracharyaji Maharaj (website Narendracharyaji Maharaj))
Notes for table Notes Sources: Boucher, Cathy (2002), The Lineage of Nine Gurus. The Navnath Sampradaya and Sri Nisargadatta Maharaj; Frydman, Maurice (1987), Navanath Sampradaya. In: I Am That. Sri Nisargadatta Maharaj, Bombay: Chetana; Websites: Amburao Maharaj (website Ranade Maharaj): Gurudev R.D. Ranade, Sadguru Shri Amburao Maharaj Archived 2008-07-22 at the Wayback Machine; Balkrishna Maharaj (website Balkrishna Maharaj): balkrushnamauli.com, Samarth Sadguru Balkrushna Maharaj; Bhausaheb Maharaj (website Ranade Maharaj): Gurudev R.D. Ranade, Sadguru Shri Bhausaheb Maharaj Umdikar; Bhausaheb Maharaj (website Ganapatrao Maharaj): ShantiKuteer Ashram, Bhausaheb Maharaj; Bhausaheb Maharaj (Nandeshwar) (website Balkrishna Maharaj): balkrushnamauli.com, Shri Bhausaheb Maharaj (Nandeshwar); Dnyaneshwar: V. V. Shirvaikar, A brief biography of saint Dnyaneshwar (Jnanadeva); Gautam Sachdeva: gautamsachdeva.com, About Gautam Sachdeva; Girimalleshwar Maharaj (website Balkrushnamauli Maharaj): balkrushnamauli.com, Girimalleshwar Maharaj; Jean Dunn (website Ed Muzika): Jean Dunn and Nisargadatta Maharaj; Jean Dunn (website Ngeton): Ngeton, Navnath Masters; Kaadsiddheshwar Maharaj (website Kaadsiddheshwar Maharaj): Mazad Sad Guru, Biography; Kaadsiddheshwar Maharaj Parampara: mazasadguru.com, The Kaadsiddheshwar Parampara; Kada Siddha (website Ranade Maharaj): Gurudev R.D. Ranade, Kada Siddha; Kada Siddha (website Balkrushna Maharaj): Balkrushna Maharaj, Kadsiddheshwar Maharaj; Madhavananda Prabhuji (website gurusfeet.com)Gurus Feet, Madhavananda Prabhuji; Nagnath Alli Maharaj (website Nagnath Alli Maharaj): Shri S.S. Nagnath Alli Maharaj Sansthan, About us; Narendracharyaji Maharaj (website Narendracharyaji Maharaj): A brief biography of Jagadguru Ramanandacharya Sri Swami Narendracharyaji Maharaj; Nimbargi Maharaj (website Ranade Maharaj): Gurudev R.D. Ranade, Sadguru Shri Guruling Jangam Maharaj; Nisargadatta Maharaj Commemorations pt.1: David Godman, Remembering Nisargadatta Maharaj pt.1; Nisargadatta Maharaj Disciples: Advaita Vision, Navnath Sampradaya. Disciples of Nisargadatta Maharaj; Ramakant Maharaj (website Ramakant Maharaj): Shri Ramakant Maharaj, Information; Ranade Maharaj (website Ranade Maharaj): Gurudev R.D. Ranade, Shri Gurudev R. D. Ranade; Ranade Maharaj (website Bridge-India): Bridge-India, Shri Gurudev R.D. Ranade; Ranjit Maharaj (website Ranjit Maharaj): Sadguru.com, Shri Ranjit Maharaj; Ranjit Maharaj Timeline: Sadguru.com, Shri Ranjit Maharaj History; Ranjit Maharaj Interview: InnerQuest, Ranjit interview; Ranjit Maharaj Satsang: inner-quest.org, "Final Reality has no beginning and no end."; Ranjit Maharaj (website Angelfire): Sri Ranjit Maharaj profile; Sailor Bob Adamson (website Sailor Bob Adamson): Sailor Bob Adamson website; Shivalingavva Akka (website Ranade Maharaj): gurudevranade.com, Rv. Smt.Shri.Shivalingavva Akka; Siddhagiri Math: Detailed history of Shri Nisarghadatta Maharaj; Siddhagiri Math (website Shri Kshetra Siddhagiri Math, Kaneri): Shri Kshetra Siddhagiri Math, Kaneri; Siddhagiri Math (Gramjivan Museum): Siddhagiri Gramjivan Museum Kaneri Math; Siddhagiri Math (website siddhagirimath.org): siddhagirimath.org, Siddhagiri Math – Pedigree; Siddhagiri Math – History (website siddhagirimath.org): siddhagirimath.org, Siddhagiri Math – History
